= German training ship Gorch Fock =

Gorch Fock is the name of the following ships of the German Navy, named for author Gorch Fock:

- Gorch Fock (1933), a three-masted barque built as a school ship, scuttled in 1945, refloated in 1947. Returned to Germany in 2003. Lead ship of the Gorch Fock-class.
- Gorch Fock (1958), a tall ship used as a training ship, in active service. Last sister ship of the Gorch Fock-class barques.

== See also ==
- Gorch Fock (disambiguation)
