= Gorch Fock =

Gorch Fock may refer to:

- Gorch Fock (author), pseudonym of Johann Wilhelm Kinau (1880-1916), German author
- Gorch Fock-class barques, class of five sailing ships built between 1933 and 1958
- Gorch Fock (1933), the first sailing ship named after him
- Gorch Fock (1958), that ship's successor
