= Rudolf Kinau =

German writer (1887–1975)

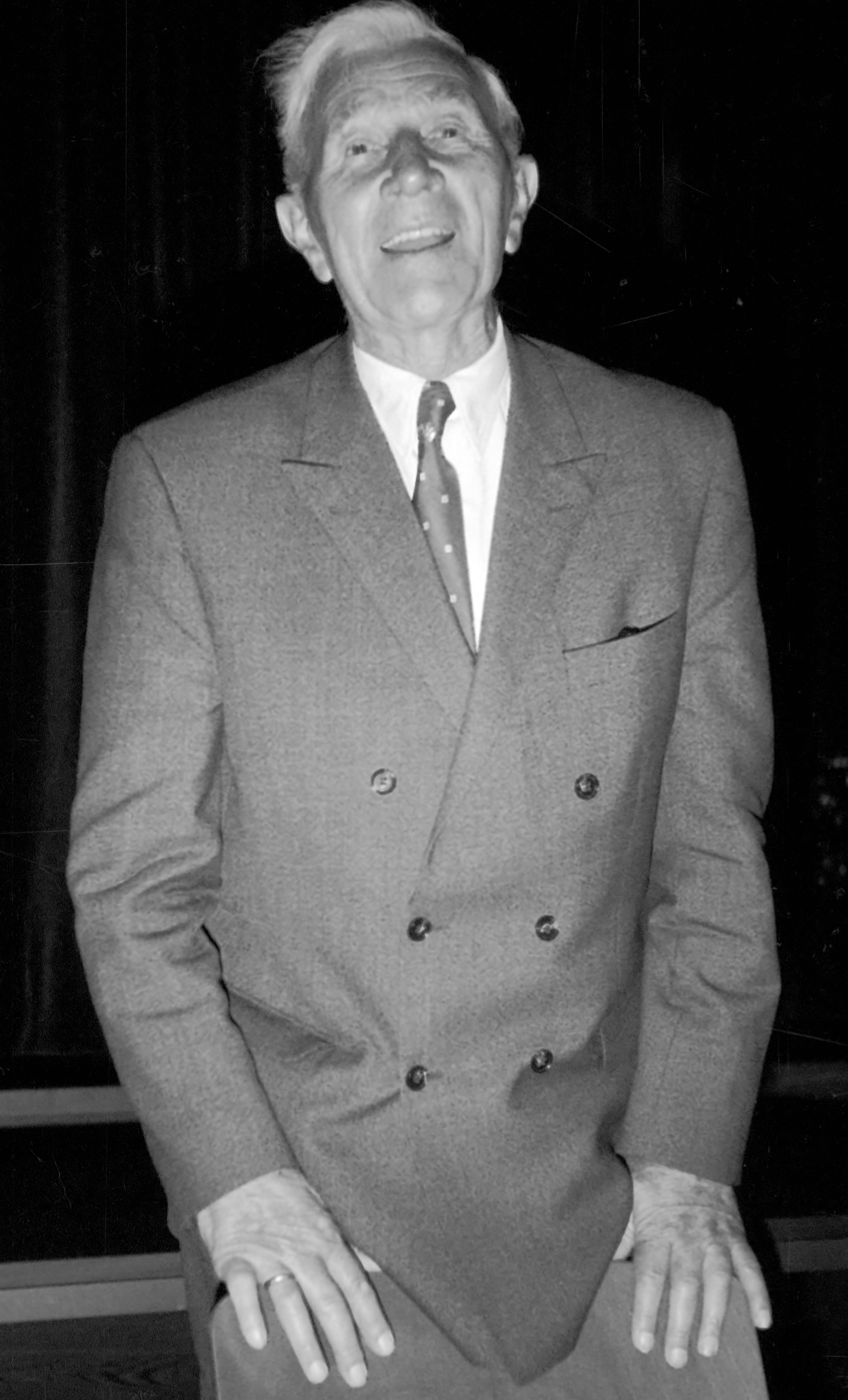
Rudolf Kinau

Rudolf Kinau, also known as Rudi Kinau (23 March 1887 – 19 November 1975) was a Low German writer.

== Early life ==
He was born in Finkenwerder, a district of the town Hamburg in northern Germany, to Heinrich Wilhelm Kinau and Metta (née Holst). His brothers were Johann Kinau, who was also a writer known as Gorch Fock; and Jakob Kinau.

== Career ==
He began writing his first book in 1916, with the death of his brother Gorch Fock (born Johann Wilhelm Kinau), who was killed in the Battle of Jutland during World War I. He became well known on radio with the series Hör mal'n beten to for the media company Norddeutscher Rundfunk. These speeches appeared in book form, among other Kamerad und Kameradin. In all he has written more than 33 books. He has also published radio and theatre plays. In addition, he discussed records, for the national series Wort und Stimme and Niederdeutsche Stimmen, in Lower German voices. In addition to a number of literary awards, such as the Fritz Reuter Prize in 1962, he was awarded the Order of Merit of the Federal Republic of Germany There are several streets named after him, e.g. in his home town of Finkenwerder, the Rudolf-Kinau avenue, in Stromaerer Ahrensburg, and the Lower Saxon communities Ostrhauderfehn, Tostedt, and Westoverledingen and also in Kellinghausen in the Rudolf-Kinau street and Schleswig-Holstein Wedel, Barmstedt, and in Uetersen the Rudolf Kinau path. In Strande (Kiel Bay) there is also Rudolf Kinau path next to the Gorch-Fock-Straße. Also schenefeld. His birthplace in Finkenwerder, the Gorch Fock house, is now a literature museum, dedicated to the poet and his two brothers. He died on 19 November 1975, aged 88,

== List of works ==
- Sünn in de Seils, Quickborn-Verlag, 1933, ISBN der 8. Auflage von 2004: 3-87651-002-3
- Sünnschien un goden Wind - Fofftig mol wat to'n Frein, Quickborn-Verlag, 1950, ISBN der 8. Auflage von 1981: 3-87651-029-5
- Scheune Bries, Quickborn Verlag, 1954
- Bi uns an'n Diek, Quickborn-Verlag, 1957
- Föör jeden wat, Quickborn-Verlag, 1958, ISBN der Auflage von 1972: 3-87651-008-2
- Mien Wihnachtsbook, Quickborn-Verlag, 1959, ISBN der 25. Auflage von 1983: 3-87651-009-0
- Mattgoot - De besten Fisch van'n letzten Fang, Quickborn-Verlag, 1967
- Rund un bunt, Quickborn-Verlag, 1972
- Bi Hus un ünnerwegens, Quickborn-Verlag, 1975, ISBN der Auflage 1981: 3-87651-047-3
- Seuk di wat ut, Quickborn-Verlag, 1973, ISBN 3-87651-041-4
- Up Finkwarder tohus - Gedichten, Riemels un wat mehr, postum erschienen, Quickborn-Verlag, 1976, ISBN 3-87651-053-8
