= Jakob Kinau =

Jakob Kinau (28 August 1884 – 14 December 1965) was a German sailor, sergeant of the Imperial German Navy, writer, publisher and customs officer.

== Background and education ==
Jakob Kinau was born to a fisherman Heinrich Wilhelm Kinau and his wife, Metta Holst. His brothers, the writer Gorch Fock, alias Johann Kinau and Rudolf Kinau. Kinau attended the elementary school and then a naval school, later in a customs school. He was in the deep sea fishing in the North Sea worked and acquired the patent as a captain on Kleiner Fahrt. His military service he rendered in the Imperial Navy. He later worked at the Hamburg water tariff.

== In World War ==
From 1916 to 1918, he was a Minenbootsmannsmaat on the auxiliary cruiser Wolf. The experiences of this trip, he processed in his literary work Adjutant des Todes. Wolfs-Tagebuch, which appeared in 1934 in Hamburg Quickborn-Verlag.

== Literary activity ==
After the end of the war, Kinau became a customs officer again; His last rank was customs inspector. From 1920 to 1934 he was president of the union of water customs officials of the German Reich. From 1924 to 1944 he was literary and editor-in-chief; his works dealt exclusively with issues of seafaring. In 1925 he published the complete works of his brother Gorch Fock. 1939/40 he published four dime novels in the series War Library of the German youth, by the High Command of the Navy has been funded for propaganda purposes. In 1950 his late work Leegerwall as continued calls from the lake.

== Works ==
- Die See ruft, Hamburg 1924
- Freie Wasser, Hamburg 1926
- Adjutant des Todes, Hamburg 1934
- Gorch Fock, München 1935
- Freibeuter, Hamburg 1938
- Der Kampf um die Seeherrschaft von der Hanse bis zum Weltkrieg, München 1938
- Den Göttern aus der Hand gesprungen, Hamburg 1939
- Durchbruch nach Oslo, Berlin 1940
- Mit Käppen Jonas auf U-Bootjagd, Berlin 1940
- Vorpostenboot "Seehund", Berlin 1940
- Der Tiger der Fjorde, Berlin 1941
- Undeichbar Land, Hamburg 1942
- Leegerwall, Hamburg 1950
- Upwussen an de Elv, Hamburg 2003 (with Gorch Fock and Rudolf Kinau)

== Editorship ==
- Gorch Fock: Sämtliche Werke, Hamburg
  - 1 (1925)
  - 2 (1925)
  - 3 (1925)
  - 4 (1925)
  - 5 (1925)
- Gorch Fock: Ein Schiff! Ein Schwert! Ein Segel!, München 1934 (edited with Marie Luise Droop)
- Gorch Fock: Seefahrt ist not!, Hamburg 1944 (edited with Maria Kinau)

== Literature on Jacob Kinau ==
- Reinhard Goltz: "Der Gott der Heimat, der beste Kamerad und der geschaßte Gewerkschafter. Die Schriftsteller Johann, Rudolf und Jakob Kinau in der Nazi-Zeit", in: Niederdeutsch im Nationalsozialismus. Studien zur Rolle regionaler Kultur im Faschismus / hrsg. von Kay Dohnke, Norbert Hopster und Jan Wirrer, Hildesheim u.a. 1994, S. 342-386.
