= Stensholmen =

Island off coast of Sweden

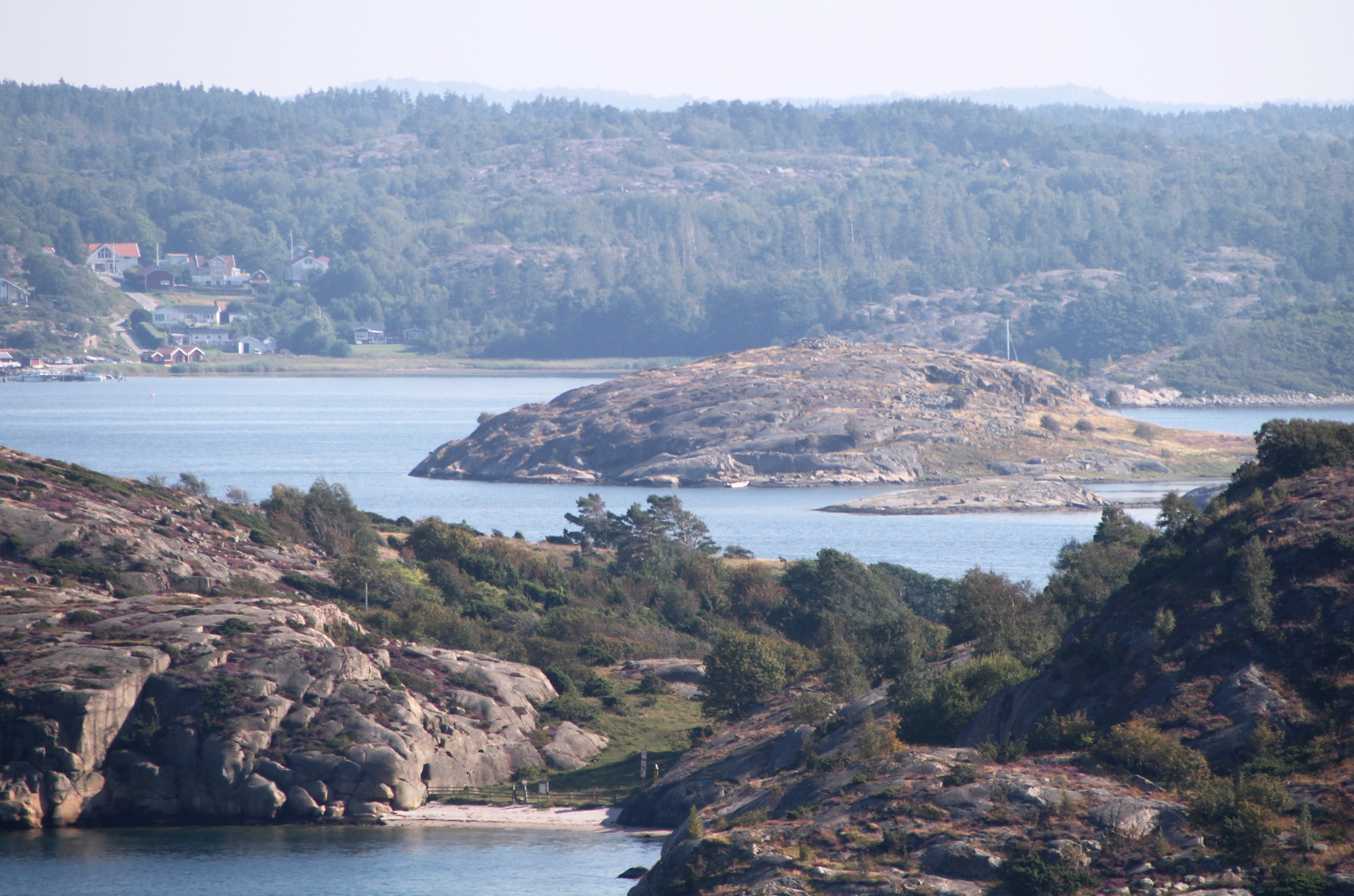
- The island Stensholmen in the Jordfjorden

- Location within Västra Götaland Location within Sweden

Geography
- Location: Hamburgsund, Tanum Municipality. Västra Götaland County, Sweden
- Coordinates: 58°34′32″N 11°16′27″E
- Archipelago: Bohuslän islands
- Area: 0.16 km^{2} (0.062 sq mi)

Administration
- Sweden

Stensholmen is a small island (or skerry) off the west coast of Sweden, in the locality of Fjällbacka. It is located in the Bohuslän province.

== War graves ==
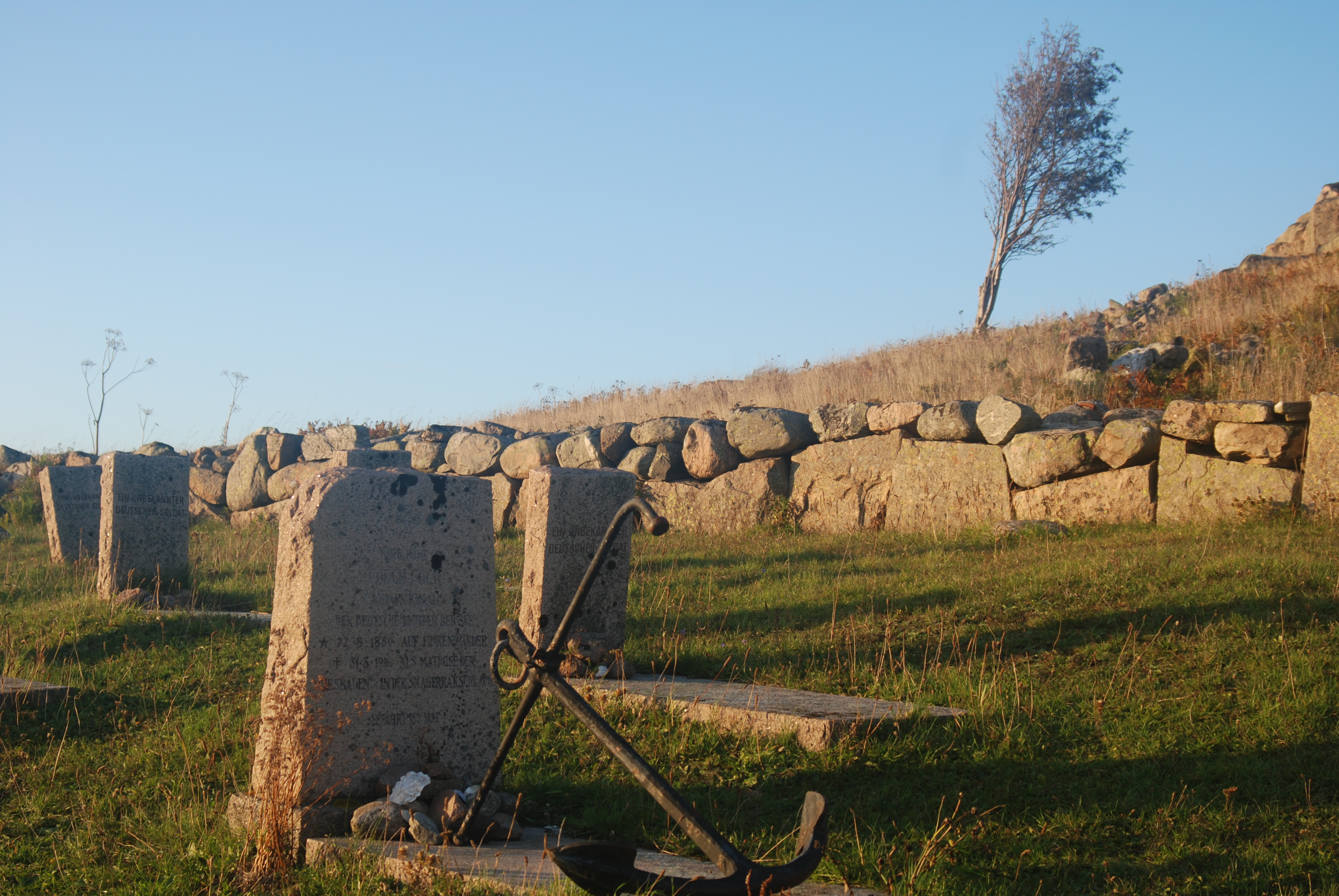
Gorch Fock's grave

Stensholmen is the last resting place of a number of German sailors killed in the Battle of Jutland during the First World War. The bodies washed up on and around the island after drifting across the 150 nautical miles separating the island from the site of the battle. The sailors whose remains were found in the area include the author Gorch Fock (real name Johann Wilhelm Kinau). Fock was found washed up on the nearby island of Trolleskären by fishermen on 1 July 1916, roughly four weeks after the battle, and buried on Stensholmen the next day. His grave is decorated with an anchor.

The war grave on Stensholmen was established in 1920 on the southern side of the island, overlooking the sea, and is currently the resting place of 12 German sailors. A plaque dated 1 July 1920, installed by the crew of the Lübeck steam-ship Dora, can be found at the site.

The graveyard is managed by the German Volksbund Deutsche Kriegsgräberfürsorge organisation. In June 2016 the island was visited by a Volksbund travel group in celebration of the 100th anniversary of the battle in order to restore the graves. The 2016 visitors aboard the Asta included eight men of the crew of the German navy training ship Gorch Fock, including her commander, Nils Brandt. In August 2020 the island was visited by the German sailing ship Alexander von Humboldt II to pay honour to the deceased sailors.

== Transport ==
Stensholmen is only accessible by boat from the port of Fjällbacka, which is situated a few kilometres away. The journey takes roughly 20 minutes. As the island lacks a dock or harbour, visitors land at a small bay in the north-east of the island that is accessible by dinghy. This bay is connected to the graveyard by a short path. Stensholmen neighbours the island of Kalvö, with three inhabitants as of 2019.

== See also ==
- List of islands of Sweden
