= Gorch Fock-class barque =

Class of sail training ships

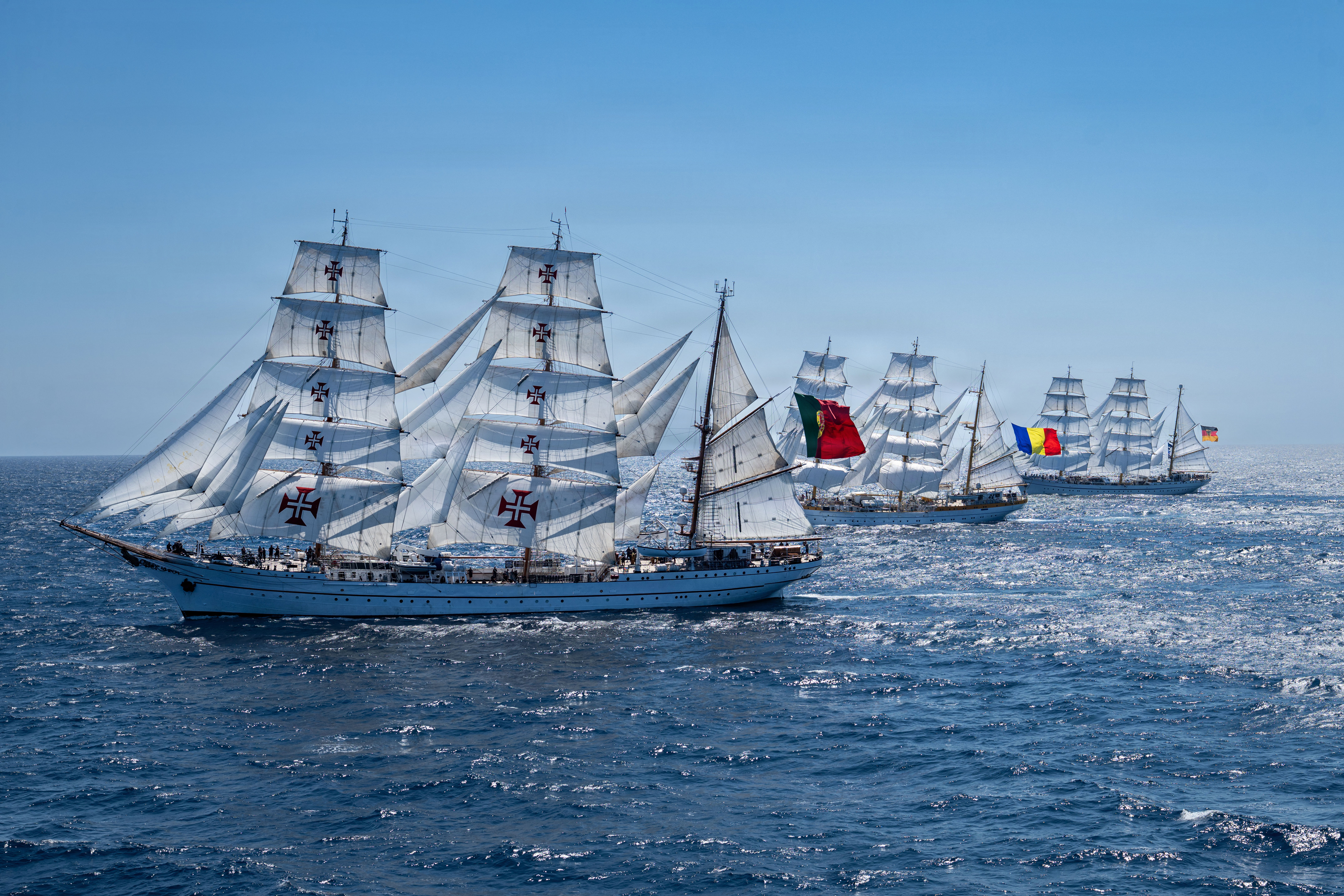
- Sagres, Mircea, and Gorch Fock (II) sailing in formation, viewed from the Eagle, July 2026

Class overview
- Name: Gorch Fock class
- Builders: Blohm & Voss
- Operators: German Navy; Portuguese Navy; Romanian Naval Forces; United States Coast Guard
- Built: 1933–1958
- Planned: 6
- Completed: 5
- Active: 4
- Preserved: 1

General characteristics
- Type: Sail training barque
- Displacement: 1,500 t (1,500 LT) – 1,750 t (1,720 LT)
- Length: 74 m (242 ft 9 in) – 89 m (292 ft 0 in) (overall length); 62 m (203 ft 5 in) – 70 m (229 ft 8 in) (waterline length)
- Beam: 12 m (39 ft 4 in)
- Height: 41.3 m (135 ft 6 in) – 45.3 m (148 ft 7 in)
- Draught: 4.8 m (15 ft 9 in) – 5 m (16 ft 5 in)
- Propulsion: Sails, auxiliary diesel engine
- Sail plan: 3 masts, 23 sails; 1,800 m^{2} (19,000 sq ft) – 1,974 m^{2} (21,250 sq ft) (sail area)
- Speed: Over 16 kn (30 km/h; 18 mph) (with sails)
- Complement: 67–78 (permanent crew)

The Gorch Fock class three-masted barques are a class of five sail training ships originally built between 1933 and 1939 by Blohm & Voss for the German Reichsmarine, later Kriegsmarine, and the Romanian Navy. After World War II, all were confiscated by the Allied powers, with the Romanian ship returned to her original owner shortly after. In 1958, a sixth ship of the same class was built for the German Navy.

== History ==
In the early 20th century, the Imperial German Navy relegated its training activities to old decommissioned cruisers. The First World War, however, demonstrated the need for developing seamanship skills among young officers. Thus, after the war, the Reichsmarine resumed sail training, commissioning the schooner Niobe for this role. Niobe capsized and sank in 1932 off Fehmarn as a result of a white squall, with the loss of 69 lives. Following this loss, the Reichsmarine commissioned the Blohm & Voss shipyard from Hamburg to build a new ship under the name "Project 1115 Replacement Niobe". A quarter of the funding was provided through donations raised following the Niobe incident.

The new ship was designed by the naval architect Wilhelm Süchting, who placed particular attention on her safety by adding enough ballast so she could right herself even if she heeled over nearly 90°. The shipyard completed works on the vessel in a record 100 days, and the ship was launched in 1933 and christened "Gorch Fock" after the pseudonym of the writer Johann Wilhelm Kinau who served and died during the Battle of Jutland aboard the cruiser SMS Wiesbaden.

Although the design had proven successful, the ship's capacity was determined to be insufficient. As such, three more ships of the same class were ordered from Blohm & Voss between 1936 and 1939. These ships – the Horst Wessel, Albert Leo Schlageter, and Herbert Norkus (the latter not completed before the start of World War II) were built on a slightly modified design of the lead ship. In 1938, the Romanian Navy also ordered a Gorch Fock class ship from Blohm & Voss. She was built on the original plans of Gorch Fock and was launched and christened Mircea in September 1938.

The last ship of the class was built in 1958 as a result of the Pamir disaster and the near-sinking of Passat. She was christened Gorch Fock as well. She was built using the plans of Albert Leo Schlageter and the parts left over from the Herbert Norkus. Several safety improvements were also implemented, such as strengthening the body and bulkheads as well as adding new lifesaving equipment and lifeboats.

== Characteristics ==
The Gorch Fock ships have a steel-hull construction with a flush deck design, and present an extended poop deck, a forecastle, and a clipper bow. All ships have a 12 m (39 ft 4 in) beam. Their original length varies, with Gorch Fock and Mircea being 74 m (242 ft 9 in) long overall and 62 m (203 ft 5 in) at the waterline, while subsequent ships had an overall length of 89 m (292 ft 0 in) and a waterline length of 70 m (229 ft 8 in). Likewise, the draught was also different, with 4.8 m (15 ft 9 in) on Gorch Fock and Mircea and 5 m (16 ft 5 in) on the other ships, due to the increased displacement from 1,500 t (1,500 long tons; 1,700 short tons) to 1,750 t (1,720 long tons; 1,930 short tons).

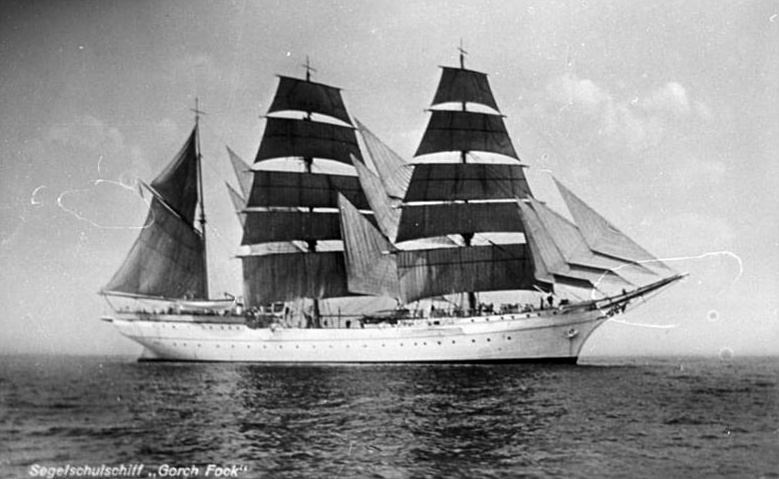
Gorch Fock in 1936

The ships' rigging consists of 23 sails – ten square sails, six staysails, four jibs, and three gaff sails. The two forward masts are square rigged and each comprise a foresail (respectively a mainsail), a split topsail, a topgallant sail, and a royal sail. The mizzenmast has a split spanker and a gaff topsail. Initially, the spanker of the Gorch Fock was not divided. This change occurred in 1937 with the addition of another gaff to the mizzenmast, a modification that had already been implemented on Horst Wessel and was retained on all following ships.

For Gorch Fock and Mircea, the total sail area was 1,800 m^{2} (19,000 sq ft), while on the other ships it was increased to 1,974 m^{2} (21,250 sq ft). The height of the main mast varied from 41.3 m (135 ft 6 in) on the Gorch Fock to 45.3 m (148 ft 7 in) on the Gorch Fock (II).

The use of sails enabled speeds of over 16 kn (30 km/h; 18 mph). Auxiliary propulsion was provided by a diesel engine. Originally a six-cylinder 520 hp (390 kW) MAN four-stroke engine was mounted on Gorch Fock, while the other ships received an eight-cylinder 750 hp (560 kW) two-stroke diesel engine. Using the engine, the Gorch Fock could reach a speed of 8 kn (15 km/h; 9.2 mph), while the others could reach a maximum speed of 10 kn (19 km/h; 12 mph).

The complement of Gorch Fock was nine officers and 58 non-commissioned officers and enlisted, and the ship could further carry 198 cadets. The rest of the ships kept the same number of officers, but increased the number of NCOs to 69. Up to 220 cadets could be accommodated aboard the ships.

During World War II, the Kriegsmarine ships were fitted with anti-aircraft weapons. The armament consisted of eight 20 mm guns mounted as follows: two on the bridge wings, two on the foredeck, and two on the waist in quad Flakvierling mounts.

== Ships in class ==
=== Gorch Fock (1933) ===
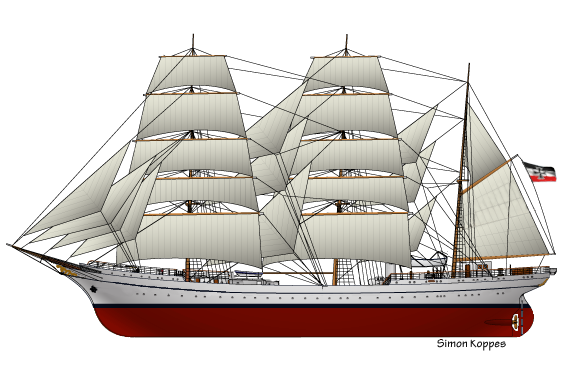
Drawing of Gorch Fock

The lead ship of her class, Gorch Fock was launched on 31 May 1933 and commissioned on 27 June the same year. She undertook several voyages before the start of World War II, and was subsequently docked in the ports of Kiel, Swinemünde, and Stralsund for the duration of the war. While in dock, she served for stationary training, and as a barracks ship. When the Red Army reached Stralsund in 1945, the ship was fired upon by Soviet tanks, sustaining several hits which caused no major damage. The crew then scuttled her off Rügen to prevent her capture.

Raised in 1947 by the Soviets, she entered Soviet Navy service under the name "Tovarishch" ("Товарищ") in 1951. She was relocated to Odesa, then to Kherson, and remained in service until the dissolution of the Soviet Union. The ship was then passed to Ukraine and kept in operation by the Kherson Maritime Academy. Due to a lack of funds for maintaining her, she was sold in 2003. Acquired by the Tall-Ship Friends association and renamed Gorch Fock, the ship was brought to Stralsund and turned into a museum ship. Due to the poor condition of the ship, she was repaired in 2024 to maintain her seaworthiness.

=== Horst Wessel (1936) ===
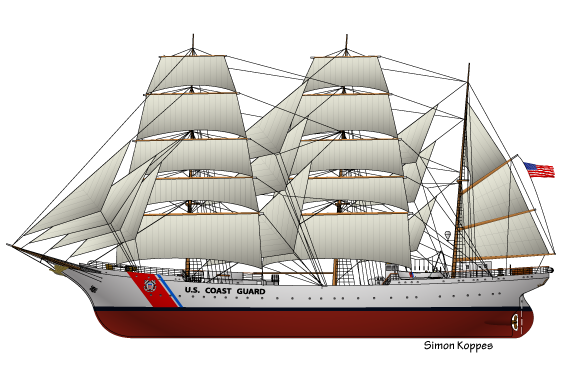
Drawing of USCGC Eagle

Now in service with the United States Coast Guard under the name USCGC Eagle (WIX-327), Horst Wessel was launched on 13 June 1936. Named after the SA leader Horst Wessel, she was commissioned on 17 September the same year. She was transferred to Kiel and carried out several voyages to Las Palmas, Norway, Britain, and the West Indies. During the war, she was initially laid up in Kiel, before being transferred to the Naval Hitler Youth in Stralsund. In 1941, she briefly served as an auxiliary ship for the Deputy fleet commander of the Navy, Konteradmiral Leopold Siemens, then was used for training again. In April 1945, Horst Wessel departed Rügen with a group of German refugees on board and sailed to Flensburg, where she surrendered to the British.

After the war, Horst Wessel was redistributed to the United States as part of war reparations and entered service with the Coast Guard on 15 May 1946. Designated US Coast Guard Cutter Eagle, she underwent multiple refits in US service. From her home port in New London, Connecticut, Eagle conducts training for cadets and officer candidates of the United States Coast Guard Academy, while also serving as a goodwill ambassador for the United States as "America's Tall Ship" in various events. She also served as Host Ship for all Operation Sail parades.

=== Albert Leo Schlageter (1937) ===
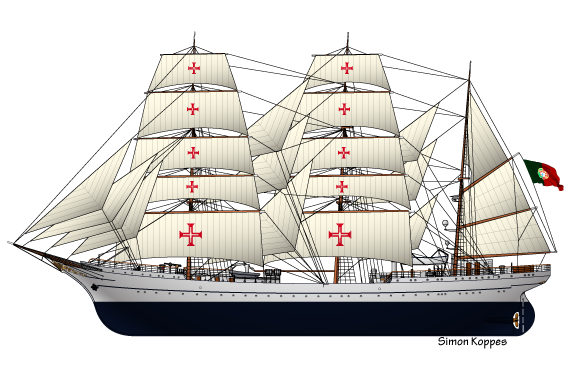
Drawing of NRP Sagres

Now in service with the Portuguese Navy under the name NRP Sagres, Albert Leo Schlageter was launched on 30 October 1937 and commissioned on 12 March 1938. She was named after Albert Leo Schlageter, a former Imperial Army officer and nationalist who carried out sabotage acts against the French occupational forces. Shortly after commissioning, the ship went on a voyage to South America but had a minor collision with a British steamer near Dover and returned home for repairs. She conducted several more voyages before the start of the war, and then served as an office ship during the war. In November 1944, she struck a Soviet mine off Sassnitz and was towed to Swinemünde. From there, the ship departed for Kiel and finally reached Flensburg, where Allied forces captured her.

She was ceded to the United States as war reparations and was then sold to Brazil in 1948. She took part in multiple voyages while in Brazilian Navy service under the name Guanabara until her decommissioning in 1960. She was then purchased by Portugal a year later through the efforts of Pedro Teotónio Pereira. In Portuguese Navy service, she replaced the former sail training ship Sagres and received the same name. Since then, she has undertaken multiple training voyages and has been overhauled twice, in 1987 and 1991.

=== Mircea (1938) ===
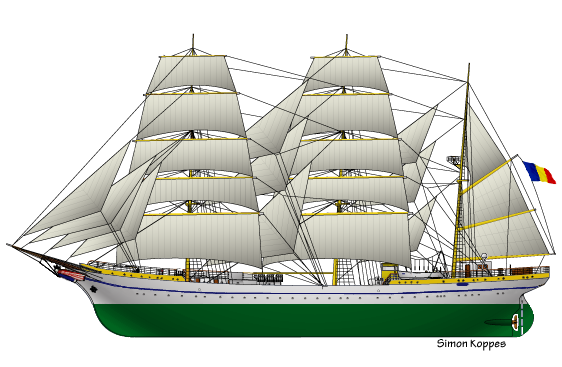
Drawing of NS Mircea

Mircea, the only sister ship designed on the original plans of Gorch Fock, was ordered by the Romanian Navy and partially funded through donations. Launched on 22 September 1938, she was christened Mircea after the old brig NMS Mircea, and after Voivode Mircea the Elder who ruled Wallachia between 1386 and 1418. She arrived in her home port of Constanța on 17 May 1939 and conducted a single training mission in the Mediterranean before the voyage was cut short by the German invasion of Poland. She returned home and was moved to Brăila, on the Danube, for protection. In September 1944, she was taken over by the USSR and brought into Soviet Navy service at Odesa under the name "Rion" ("Рион"). Through the intervention of Vice Admiral Petre Bărbuneanu, the vessel was returned to Romanian service in May 1946.

After her return, Mircea conducted short training voyages before getting transferred to an auxiliary role. She resumed training after going through an extensive overhaul in Hamburg in 1966. During the voyage to Hamburg, the ship encountered a strong storm in the Bay of Biscay and nearly ran aground at Chaussée de Sein. She underwent another refit between 1994 and 2002. Since 1966, the ship has conducted many training and representation marches in international waters and crossed the Atlantic four times.

=== Herbert Norkus (1939) ===
Herbern Norkus was launched ahead of schedule on 7 November 1939 as the slipway was needed for the construction of U-boats. She was named after the Hitler Youth martyr Herbert Norkus. Due to the early launch, her engine was never fitted, although her hull and lower masts were completed. The rigging was likewise prepared, but never mounted. The ship remained in Hamburg and served as an accommodation vessel for the Kriegsmarine shipbuilding training units. During the war, her hull was repainted from white to brown and later grey.

At the end of the war, Herbert Norkus was requisitioned by the Allies. She was intended to be sold to Brazil, but the plan was abandoned due to the extensive damage sustained by the ship during air raids in March 1945. Instead, she was loaded with poison gas munitions and sunk in the Skagerrak in 1947. Her rigging and masts were saved by the shipyard and were later utilized in the construction of the second Gorch Fock in 1958.

=== Gorch Fock (1958) ===
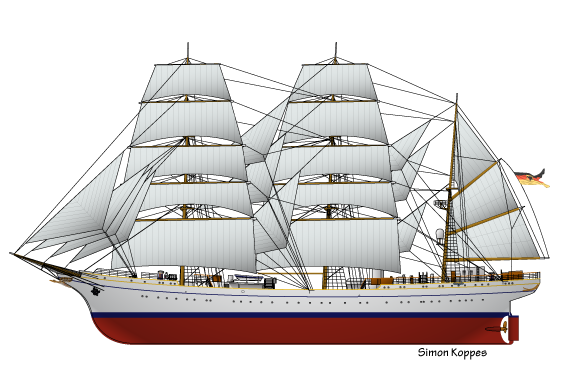
Drawing of Gorch Fock (II)

Gorch Fock, unofficially referred to as Gorch Fock (II) to differentiate from her similarly named sister ship, was launched on 23 August 1958. After the sinking of Pamir in 1957, it was decided that training cadets aboard sail ships was still needed, and thus, Blohm & Voss was commissioned to build a new sail training vessel. The new ship was built on the plans of Albert Leo Schlageter and using the parts left over from Herbert Norkus. She was named after the lead ship of the class, which had been taken by the Soviets, and entered service on 17 December 1958. The first overseas voyage took place a year later. Since then, the ship has conducted multiple training voyages and represented Germany abroad.

In 2010, an officer cadet aboard the ship died while climbing on the rigging. As a result of this incident, some cadets refused to climb on the masts, and several others wanted to leave the ship. This incident was described as a mutiny, and training on the ship was suspended until 2012. Between 2015 and 2021, the ship went through an extensive overhaul, during which Gorch Fock (II) did not carry out any training voyages, and the German Navy made use of other ships for cadet training, such as Alexander von Humboldt II, Statsraad Lehmkuhl, and Gorch Fock's sister ship Mircea.

=== Spanish-built ships ===
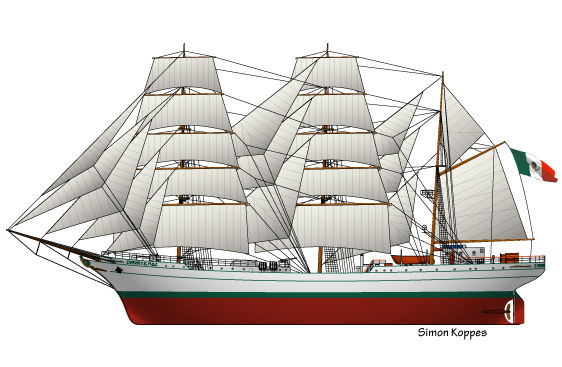
Drawing of ARM Cuauhtémoc

The Astilleros Celaya S.A. shipyard from Bilbao, Spain further built four ships designed in cooperation with the engineering company SENER and the classification society Germanischer Lloyd, and modeled after the Gorch Fock-class for the Latin American Navies. These included Gloria (built in 1967 for Colombia), Guayas (built in 1976 for Ecuador), Simón Bolívar (built in 1979 for Venezuela), and Cuauhtémoc (built in 1982 for Mexico).

Although the Spanish ships resemble the Gorch Fock in design principles and safety concept, they are generally not considered part of the Gorch Fock class. The ships also reflect the requirements of their clients, featuring a different shape for their sterns and superstructures, and being adapted for long-range voyages by carrying larger supplies of fuel and water.

== Five Sisters Cup ==
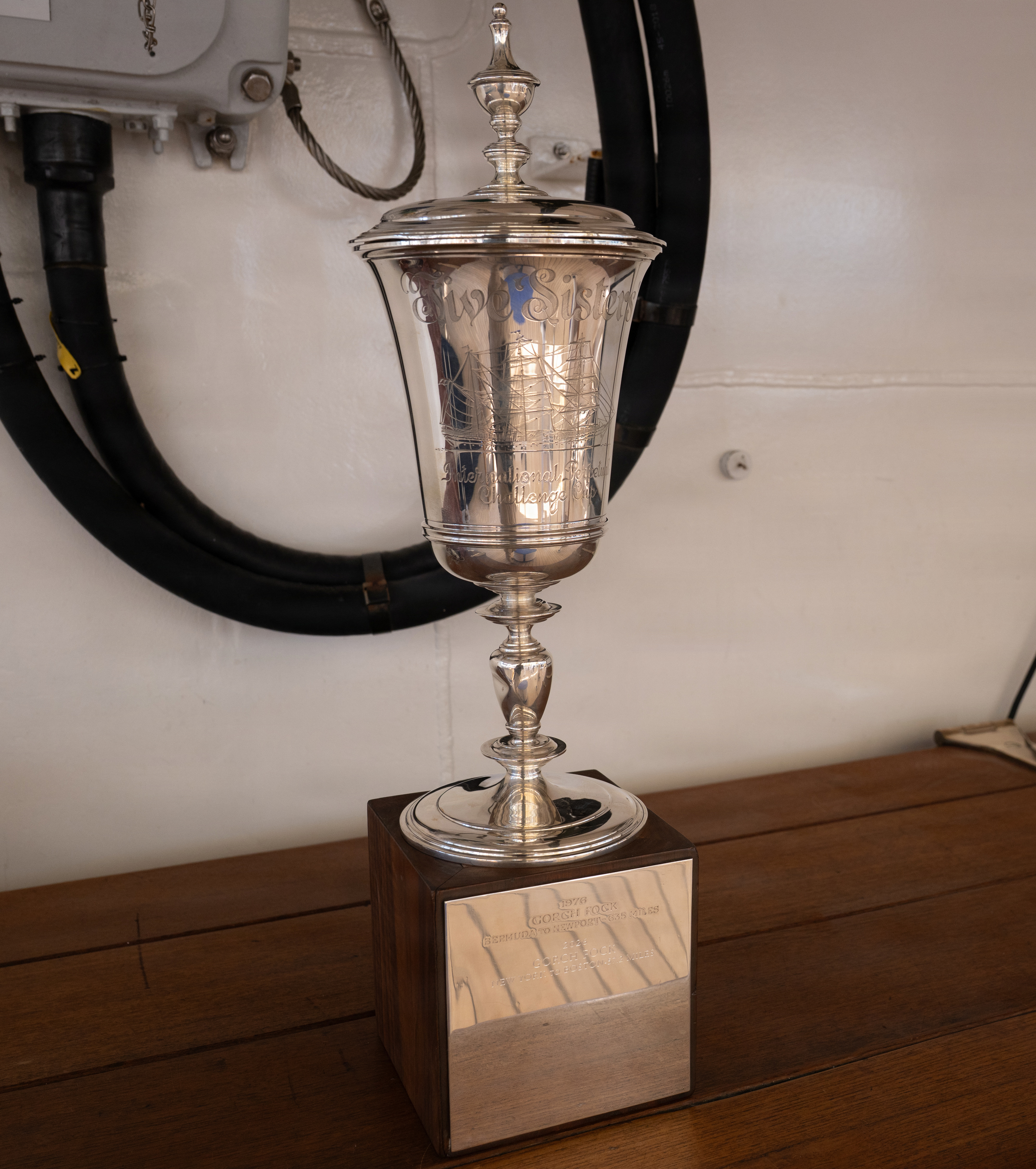
The cup in 2026

In 1976, on the occasion of America's Bicentennial, a tall ship race was organized between the five Gorch Fock sister ships. Named the "Five Sisters Cup", the race took place between Bermuda and Newport before the ships participated in the 4th July New York parade of sail. The event was organized again in 2026 for Sail250, and it took place after the Semiquincentennial celebrations, with the four active sister ships racing from New York, then around Cape Cod to Provincetown on their way to Boston. Gorch Fock (II) won the Tiffany trophy of the race on both occasions.

== Bibliography ==
- Gröner, Erich (1968). Die deutschen Kriegsschiffe 1815–1945 (in German). Vol. 2: Spezial-, Hilfskriegs-, Hilfsschiffe, Kleinschiffsverbände. München: J. F. Lehmanns Verlag.
- Hildebrand, Hans H.; Röhr, Albert; Steinmetz, Hans-Otto (1979). Die deutschen Kriegsschiffe: Biographien – ein Spiegel der Marinegeschichte von 1815 bis zur Gegenwart (in German). Vol. 1. Herford Koehler. ISBN 9783782202091.
- Hildebrand, Hans H.; Röhr, Albert; Steinmetz, Hans-Otto (1985). Die deutschen Kriegsschiffe: Biographien – ein Spiegel der Marinegeschichte von 1815 bis zur Gegenwart (in German). Vol. 3. Herford Koehler. ISBN 9783782203715.
- Holtkamp, Tido (2008). A Perfect Lady: A Pictorial History of the U.S. Coast Guard Barque Eagle. Mystic, CT: Flat Hammock Press. ISBN 978-0-9795949-2-2.
