= NRP Sagres (1937) =

Tall ship and school ship of the Portuguese Navy

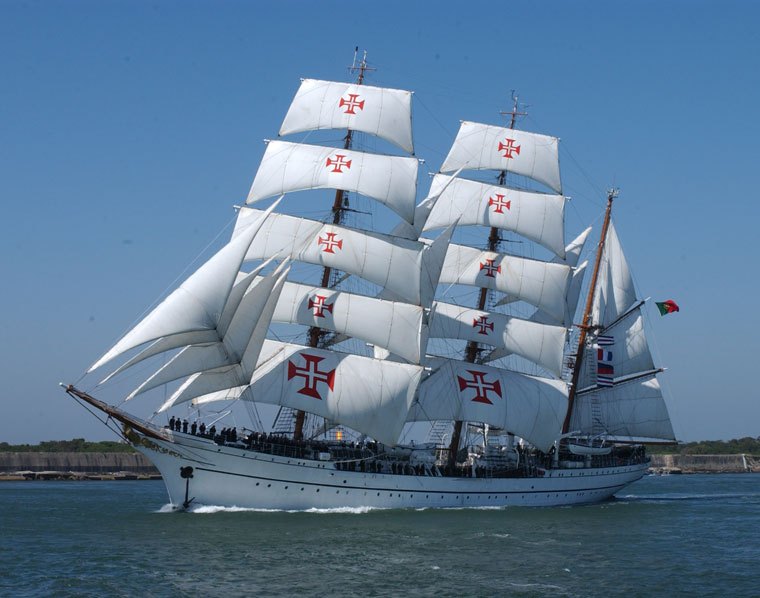
- The Portuguese Navy school ship Sagres under full sail

History

Germany
- Name: Albert Leo Schlageter
- Namesake: Albert Leo Schlageter
- Builder: Blohm & Voss; Hamburg, Germany
- Launched: 1937
- Identification: IMO number: 8642579
- Fate: Seized as war reparation by the United States

United States
- Acquired: 1945
- Fate: Sold to the Brazilian Navy

Brazil
- Name: Guanabara
- Namesake: Guanabara Bay
- Acquired: 1948
- Identification: IMO number: 8642579
- Fate: Sold to Portuguese Navy

Portugal
- Name: NRP Sagres
- Namesake: Sagres school
- Acquired: 1961
- Identification: IMO number: 8642579; MMSI number: 263141000; Callsign: CTEC
- Status: Training ship

General characteristics
- Class & type: Gorch Fock-class barque
- Displacement: 1,755 long tons (1,783 t)
- Length: 89 m (292 ft 0 in) o/a
- Beam: 12 m (39 ft 4 in)
- Draught: 5.2 m (17 ft 1 in)
- Sail plan: 2,000 m^{2} (22,000 sq ft) sail area
- Speed: 17 knots (31 km/h; 20 mph)

NRP Sagres is a tall ship and school ship of the Portuguese Navy since 1961. As the third ship with this name in the Portuguese Navy, she is sometimes referred to as Sagres III.

== Design and specifications ==
The ship is a steel-built three masted barque, with square sails on the fore and main masts and gaff rigging on the mizzen mast. Her main mast rises 42 m (138 ft) above the deck. She carries 22 sails totaling about 2,000 m^{2} (22,000 sq ft) and can reach a top speed of 17 kn (31 km/h; 20 mph) under sail. She has a sparred length of 89 m (292 ft), a width of 12 m (39 ft), a draught of 5.2 m (17 ft), and a displacement at full load of 1,755 long tons (1,966 short tons).

== Ship history ==
The three-masted ship was launched under the name Albert Leo Schlageter on 30 October 1937 at Blohm & Voss in Hamburg for Nazi Germany's Kriegsmarine. The ship was named after Albert Leo Schlageter, who was executed in 1923 by French forces occupying the Ruhr area. Her first commander was Bernhard Rogge. Schlageter/Sagres is a sister ship of the Gorch Fock (1933, taken by Soviets), the Horst Wessel (USCGC Eagle), the Romanian training vessel Mircea (1938), the never completed Herbert Norkus (after Herbert Norkus), and finally the Gorch Fock II which was built in 1958 by the Germans to have at least one replacement for the ships lost after the war.

Following a number of international training voyages, the ship was used as a stationary office ship after the outbreak of World War II and was only put into ocean-going service again in 1944 in the Baltic Sea. On 14 November 1944 she hit a Soviet mine off Sassnitz and had to be towed to port in Swinemünde. Eventually transferred to Flensburg, she was taken over there by the Allies when the war ended and finally confiscated by the United States.

In 1948, the U.S. sold her to Brazil for a symbolic price of US$5,000. She was towed to Rio de Janeiro where she sailed as a school ship for the Brazilian Navy under the name Guanabara. In 1961, Ambassador Teotónio Pereira of Portugal, who was also a man of the sea, loved sailing ships, and had been an organizer of the first Tall Ships' Races, persevered in his mediations and the Portuguese Navy bought the Guanabara to replace the previous school ship Sagres (which was transferred to Hamburg, where she is a museum ship under her original name Rickmer Rickmers). The Portuguese Navy renamed Guanabara as Sagres (the third ship of that name), where she remains in service to this day.

In 2010, the ship performed her longest voyage, a round the world trip performing an approximate total of 35000 miles, under the command of CMG Pedro Proença Mendes. The ship left Lisbon on 19 January and returned on 24 December, having participated in Velas Sudamerica 2010, a historic Latin American tour by eleven tall ships to celebrate the bicentennial of the first national governments of Argentina and Chile. She also took part in the Expo Shanghai, among other events during that year.

The ship has sailed under the Portuguese flag since 1962. For that reason, in 2012 there were major commemorations of her 75th anniversary and 50 years in the service of the Portuguese navy.

== Sister ships ==
- Gorch Fock (ex-Tovarishch)
- USCGC Eagle (ex-Horst Wessel)
- Herbert Norkus, never completed
- Mircea, Romanian sail training ship
- Gorch Fock II

== Gallery ==
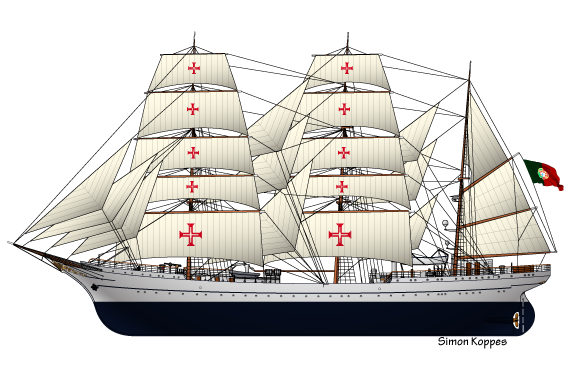
Line art of the Sagres

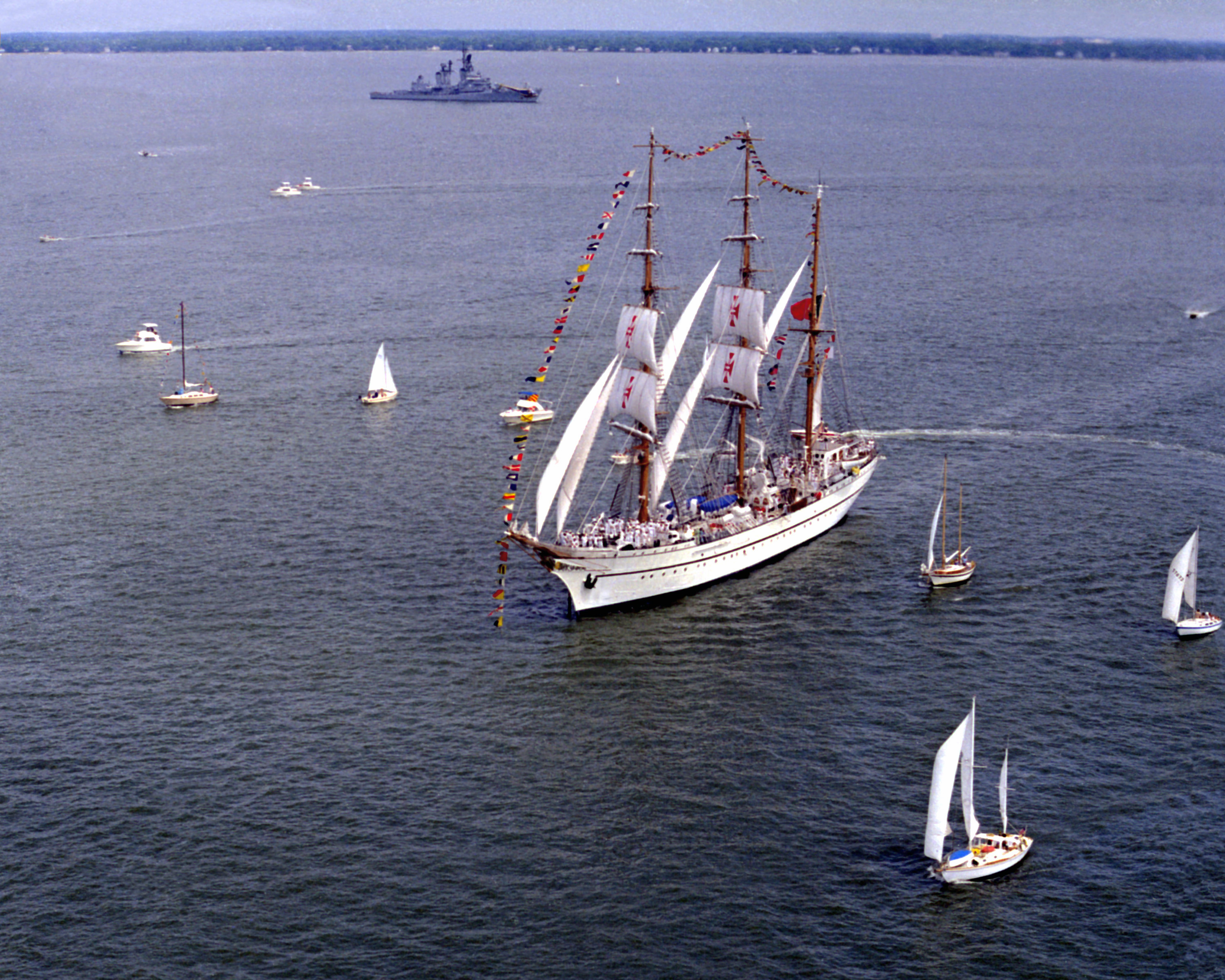
Sagres during Harborfest '82

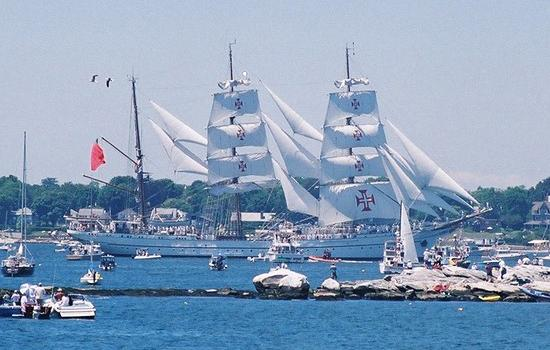
The Sagres at OpSail 2000

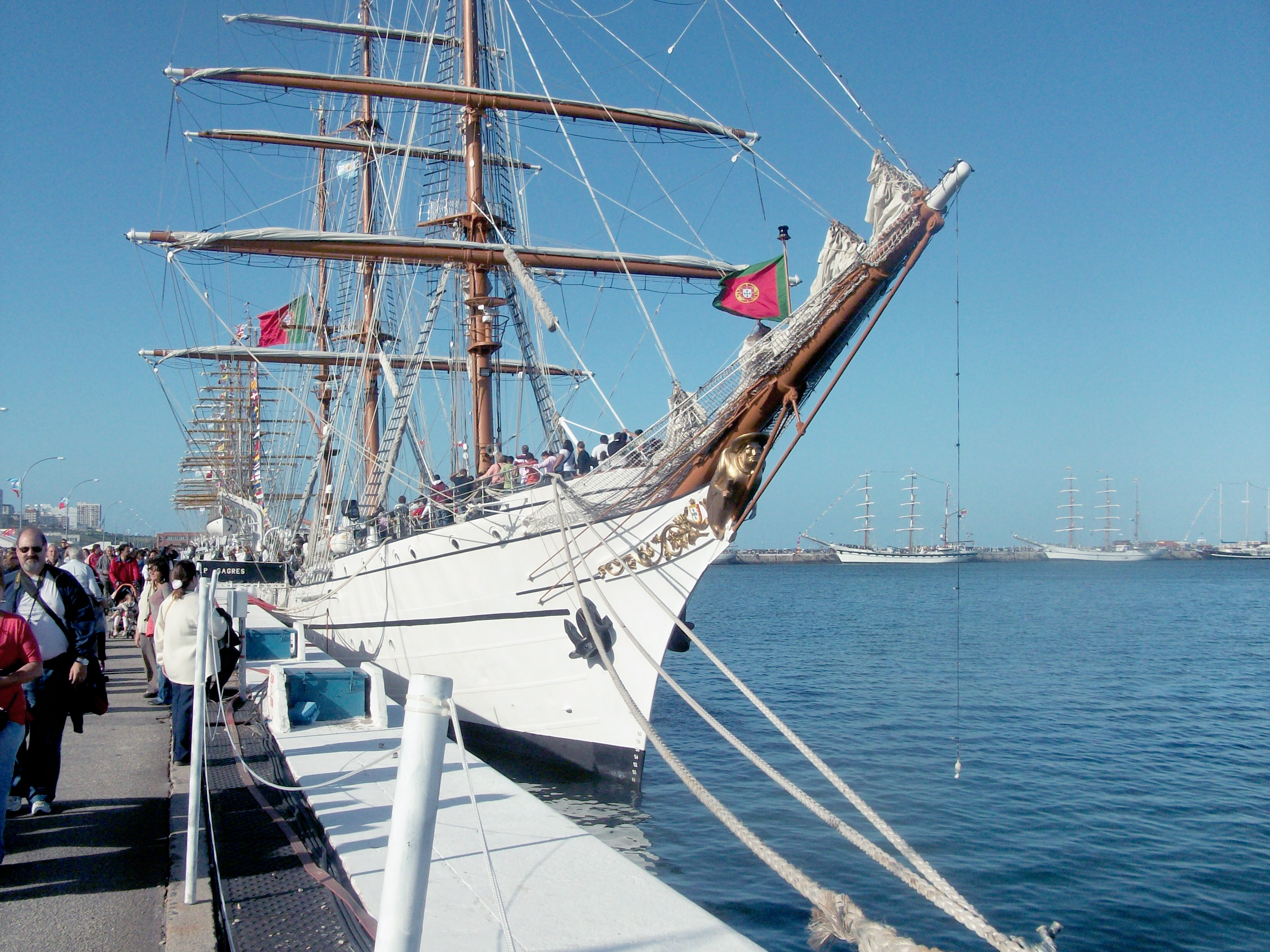
Sagres at dock in Mar del Plata, Argentina, February 2010

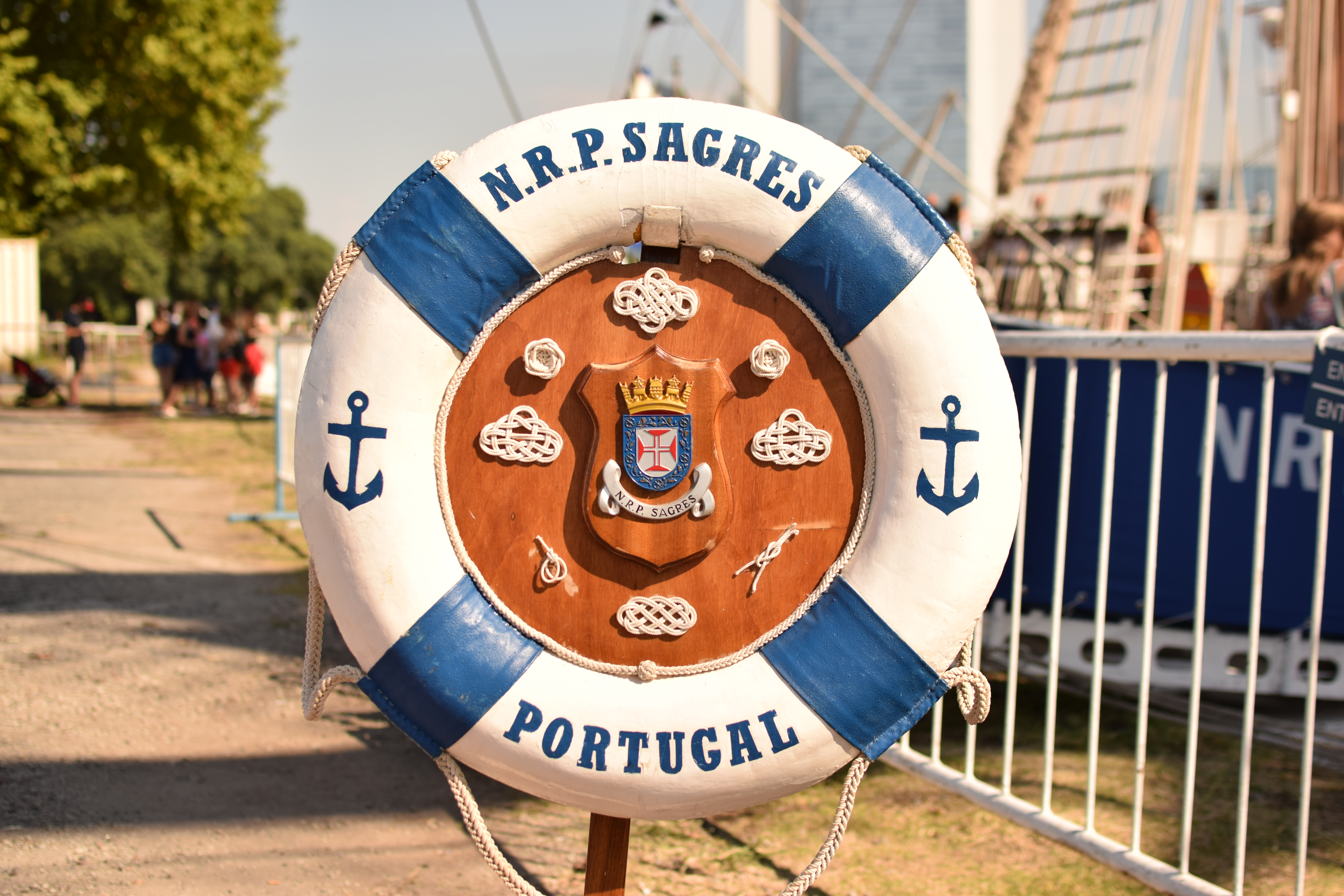
Decorative buoy, Sagres

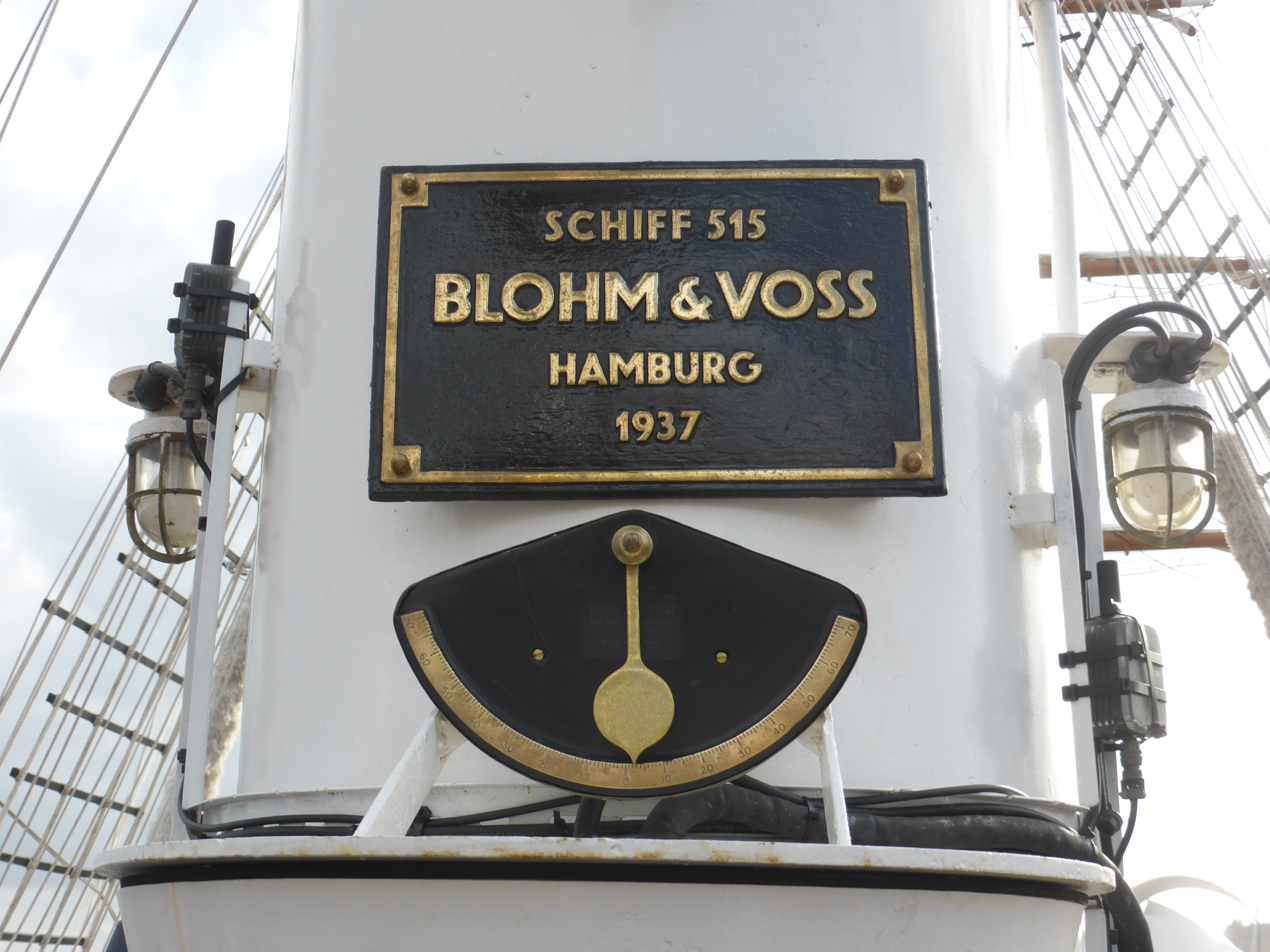
Sagres' builders' plaque

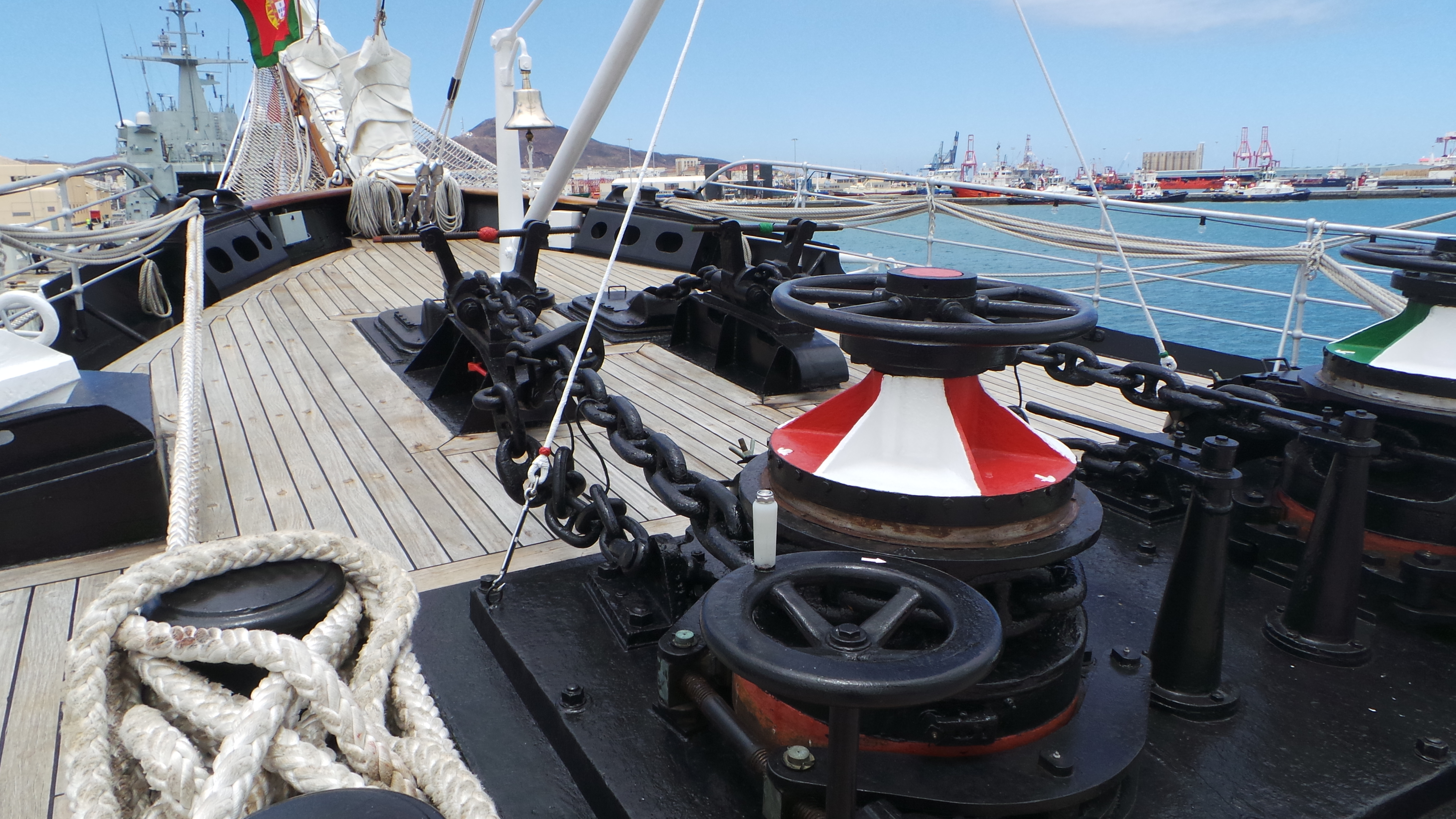
Sagres, view from aboard

== See also ==
- List of naval ships of Germany
- List of Kriegsmarine ships
