= Gorch Fock (1933) =

German museum ship

Coordinates: 54°19′00″N 13°05′54″E

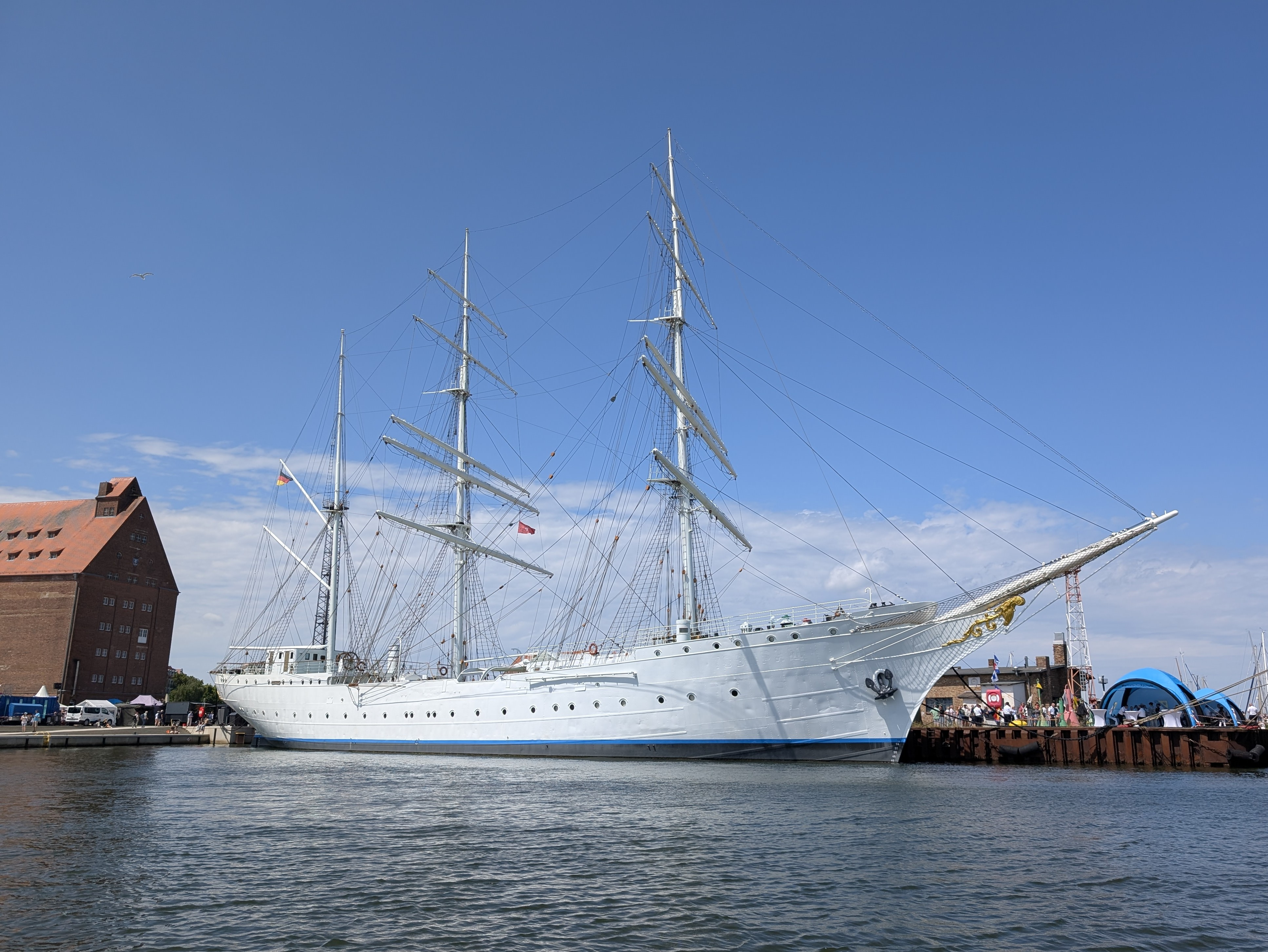
- Gorch Fock in Stralsund, 2025

History

Germany
- Name: Gorch Fock
- Namesake: Gorch Fock
- Builder: Blohm & Voss, Hamburg
- Laid down: 2 December 1932
- Launched: 3 May 1933
- Commissioned: 26 June 1933
- Fate: Scuttled, 1 May 1945

Soviet Union
- Name: Tovarishch
- Acquired: by salvage, 1947
- In service: 1951
- Out of service: 1993
- Fate: Passed to Ukraine, 1993

Ukraine
- Name: Tovarysh
- Owner: Ministry of Education (Ukraine)
- Acquired: 1993
- Fate: Sold to Germany in 2003

Germany
- Name: Gorch Fock
- Acquired: 2003
- Status: Museum ship

General characteristics
- Class & type: Gorch Fock-class barque
- Displacement: 1,510 long tons (1,534 t) full load
- Length: 82.1 m (269 ft)
- Beam: 12 m (39 ft)
- Height: 41.3 m (135 ft) at main mast
- Draught: 5.2 m (17 ft)
- Propulsion: 550 hp (410 kW) auxiliary engine
- Sail plan: Barque, 1,753 m^{2} (18,870 sq ft) sail area

Gorch Fock I (ex Tovarishch, ex Gorch Fock) is a German three-mast barque, the first of a series of school ships for the German Reichsmarine built from 1933 to 1958, when the last sister ship was built as replacement, thus also named Gorch Fock, and still in service.

Scuttled at the end of World War II, she was salvaged in 1947 and taken as war reparations by the Soviet Union, renamed Tovarishch, and serving for decades. In the late 1980s, Poland built a series of modern tall ships that since 1991 are in the services of Russia and Ukraine. Until 1993 the old ship spent a short period under the Ukrainian flag, followed by a prolonged stay in British ports due to lack of funds for necessary repairs.

After being acquired by German sponsors, she sailed to her original home port of Stralsund where her original name of Gorch Fock was restored on 29 November 2003. She now serves as a museum ship, and extensive repairs were carried out in 2008.

== History and details ==
The German school ship Niobe, a three-masted barque launched in 1913, capsized on 26 July 1932 in the Baltic Sea near Fehmarn due to a sudden squall, killing 69. Flags were lowered to half-mast from Flensburg to Konstanz as a public outpouring of grief gripped the nation. The Prussian State Mint issued a Niobe memorial coin to help raise money for a replacement ship, and soon earned 200,000 Reichsmarks towards the effort. The loss prompted the German Navy to order a new training vessel built.

A request for proposal went out to all the major shipyards, including Deutsche Werke, Howaldtswerke, and Germaniawerft for the "Project 1115 Replacement Niobe". Joh. C. Tecklenborg, who in 1914 had built one of Germany's previous training ships, Grossherzog Friedrich August, which since 1921 is in Norwegian service as Statsraad Lehmkuhl, had just gone out of business and was unable to compete. Dr Wilhelm Süchting's design for Blohm+Voss, which in 1909 had also built the German training ship, Prinzess Eitel Friedrich which since 1930 was in POlish service as Dar Pomorza, won the bid, and construction began at their yard in Hamburg on 2 December 1932. She was completed in a record 100 days.

On 3 May 1933 the ship was launched and named Gorch Fock in honor of German writer Johann Kinau, who wrote under the pseudonym "Gorch Fock". Kinau had died in the 1916 Battle of Jutland aboard the cruiser SMS Wiesbaden. 10,000 spectators attended Gorch Fock's launching, including Johann Kinau's mother. The launching was presided by Admiral Erich Raeder, and christened by Marie Fröhlich of the "German Woman's Fleet Association", with the Karlsruhe on station as a guard of honor.

Commissioned by the German Navy on 26 June 1933, Gorch Fock is a three-masted barque. She has square sails on the fore and main masts, and is gaff rigged on the mizzen. The steel hull has a sparred length of 82.1 m (269 ft), a width of 12 m (39 ft) and a draught of 5.2 m (17 ft). She has a displacement at full load of 1510 tons. Her main mast stands 41.30 m (135 ft) high above deck and she carries 23 sails totalling 1,753 m^{2} (18,869 sq ft). She is equipped with an auxiliary engine of 410 kW (550 hp).

The training ship was designed to be robust and safe against capsizing. More than 300 tons of steel ballast in the keel give her a righting moment large enough to bring her back upright position even if she heels over to nearly 90°.

Gorch Fock served as a training vessel for the German Reichsmarine prior to World War II. During the war, she was a stationary office ship in Stralsund, until she was officially reactivated on 19 April 1944. On 1 May 1945, the crew scuttled her in shallow waters off Rügen in an attempt to avoid her capture by the Soviets, who already had fired at her with tanks for 45 minutes.

The Soviets ordered Stralsund-based company "B. Staude Schiffsbergung" to raise and salvage her, which after some difficulties was done in 1947 at a cost of 800,000 Reichsmark (equivalent to 3 million 2021 euros). She was under restoration between 1948 and 1950. She was then named Tovarishch (Russian for "Comrade") in 1951 and put into service as a training vessel. Her new home port was Odessa. She participated in many Tall Ships' Races and cruised far and wide on the seven seas. She made a voyage around the world in 1957 and won the Operation Sail race twice, in 1974 and 1976.

After the dissolution of the Soviet Union in 1991, Tovarishch sailed under the Ukrainian flag (home port Kherson) until 1993, when she needed repairs and was deactivated for lack of funds. In 1994, she sailed from Kherson to Newcastle-upon-Tyne, where private sponsors wanted to have her repaired. This stalled because of the high costs, and, declared unseaworthy, she was left moored at Middlesbrough's Middlehaven for five years. During this time, she was continually crewed by cadets from the Kherson State Maritime Academy (the crews were changed twice yearly), and provided with electricity and provisions.

In August 1999, with funding secured for her restoration, the ship was transported to Wilhelmshaven, where she stayed in dock for four years until finally transferred to Stralsund in 2003. On 29 November 2003 the ship was re-christened Gorch Fock. By 2011 the ship was in poor but stable condition, needing about six million dollars' worth of work to bring it back to sailing condition. The museum had a dismal tourist season, resulting in a fifty thousand dollar loss in revenue from previous years, and forcing a layoff of five workers. Restorations were finally completed at a shipyard in Stralsund in 2024.

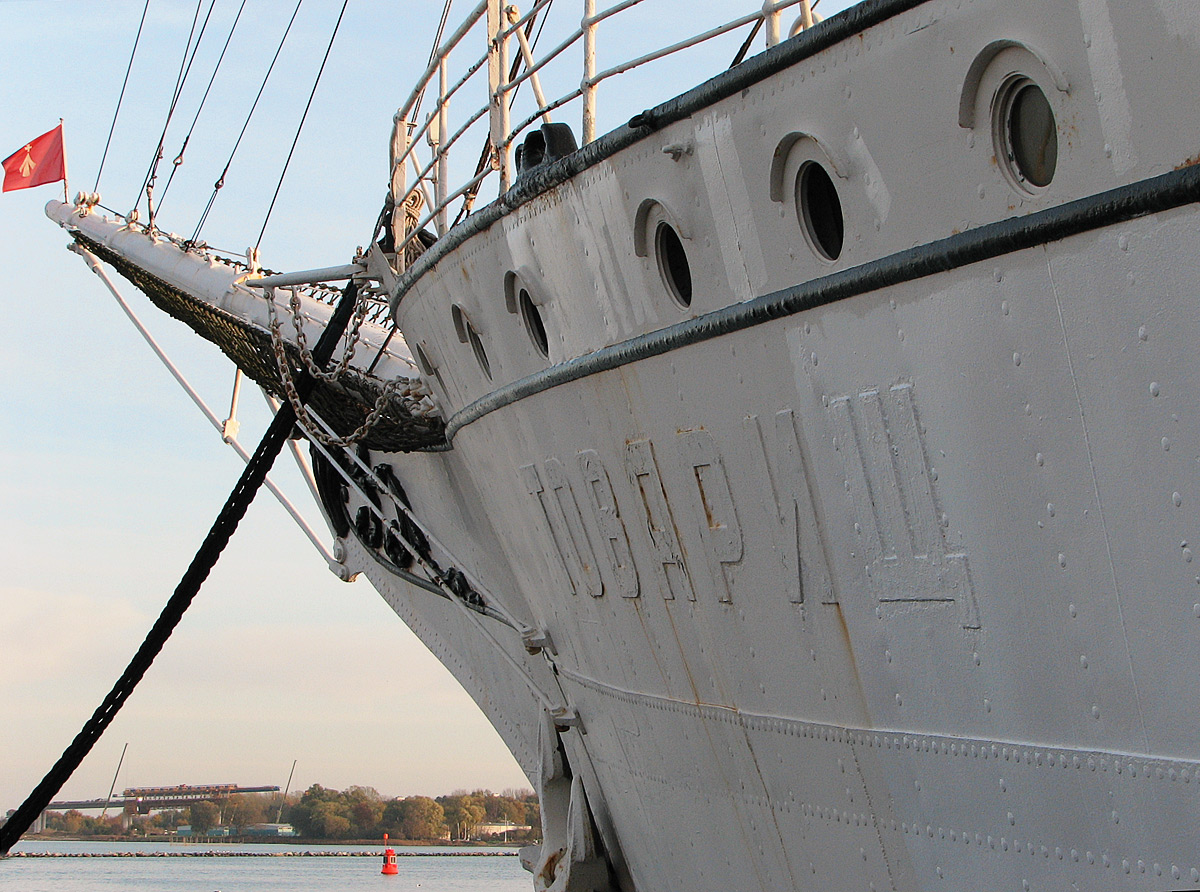
Showing Stralsund flag, and with name "товарищ" painted over

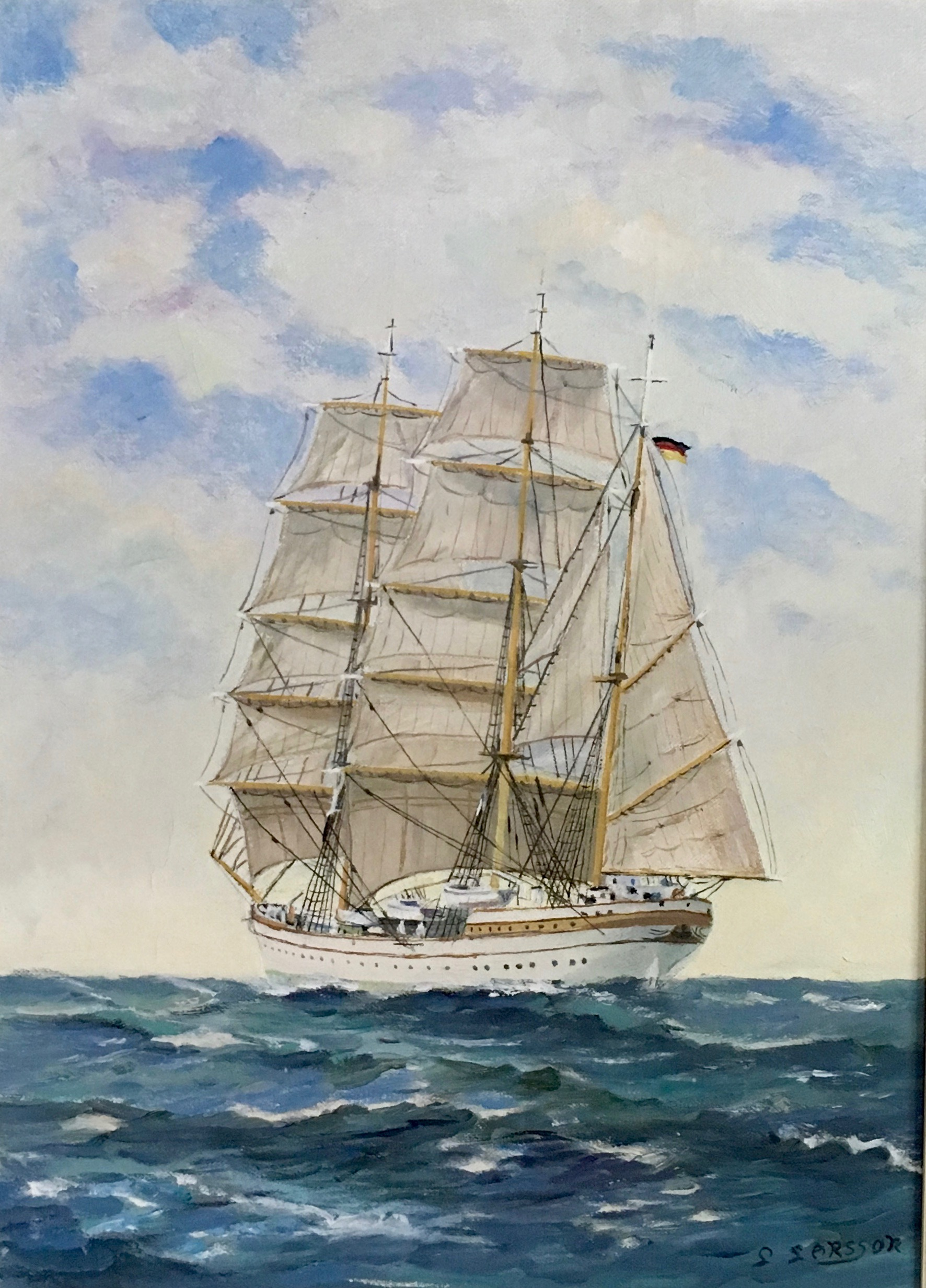
Gorch Fock, painting of her early days at sea by the Swedish artist Gunnar Larsson (1907–1982).

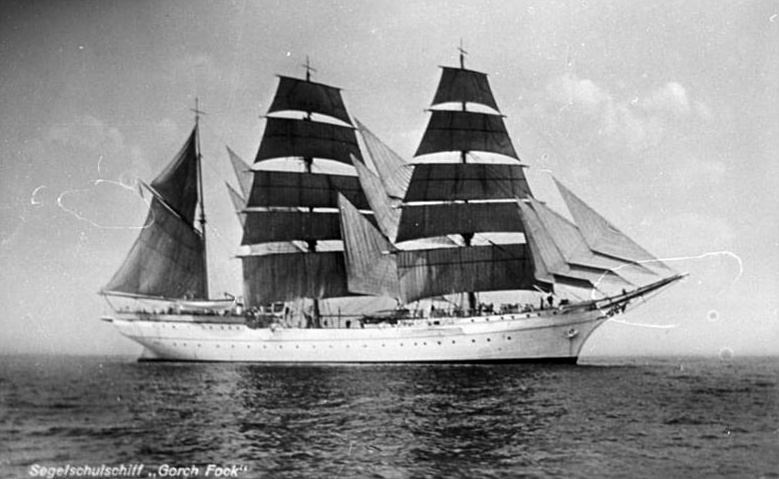
Gorch Fock in the 1930s

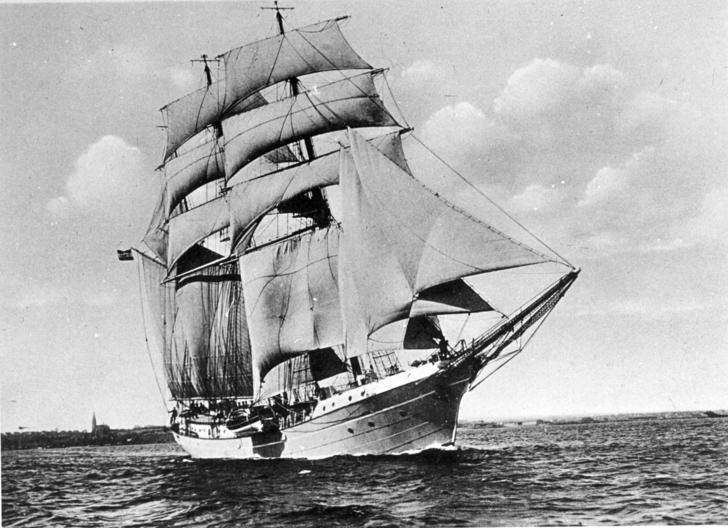
Niobe, 1930

== Sister ships ==
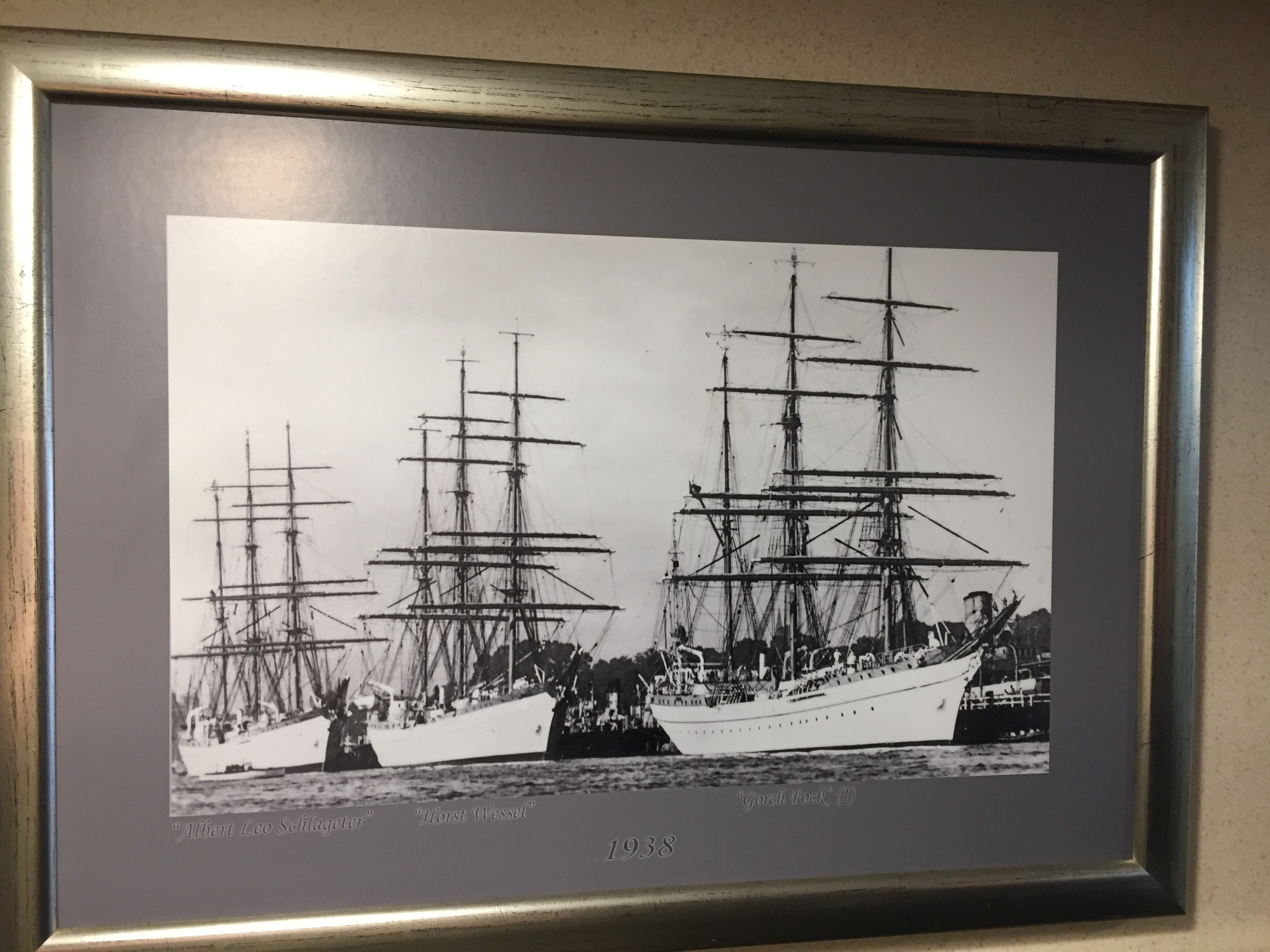
1938 image of Albert Leo Schlageter, Horst Wessel, and Gorch Fock in Eagle's Wardroom

The design of Gorch Fock proved highly successful. She was the first of a series of five resp. six sister ships built by Blohm & Voss until 1958. Since the 1960s, four school ships for South American navies, built in Bilbao starting with ARC Gloria, are also based on the same design. Poland used an older Blohm & Voss training ship as Dar Pomorza, and as replacement in the 1980s built the Dar Młodzieży class of six ships, mostly in Russian service today.

Of the three completed original sister ships, only Mircea made for Romania is an exact replica of Gorch Fock. Horst Wessel and Albert Leo Schlageter are 7 metres (23 ft) longer, and all three have slightly more powerful auxiliary engines.

=== USCGC Eagle (ex Horst Wessel) ===
Horst Wessel was launched in 1936—the growing Reichsmarine needed more school ships. Her home port was Kiel. At the end of World War II, she became one of several war reparations and was assigned to the United States. After some repairs in Wilhelmshaven and Bremerhaven, she was sailed by her German crew including the Captain together with American sailors to her new home port of New London, Connecticut. Since then, she has sailed under the name Eagle for the United States Coast Guard.

=== Sagres (ex Albert Leo Schlageter) ===
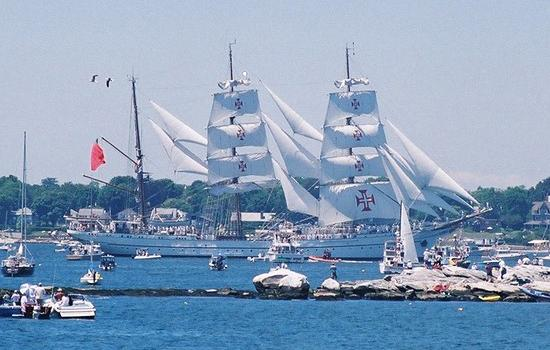
Sagres at OpSail 2000 in New London, Connecticut where her sister ship Eagle is home-ported.

Albert Leo Schlageter was launched on 30 October 1937. She was confiscated by the United States after World War II and then sold to Brazil, where she sailed as a school ship under the name Guanabara. In 1961, the Portuguese Navy bought her to replace the previous school ship Sagres (which was later transferred to Hamburg, where she is a museum ship under her original name Rickmer Rickmers). The Portuguese named her Sagres also. She still sails as of 2015, having completed a circumnavigation on 24 December 2010.

=== Mircea ===
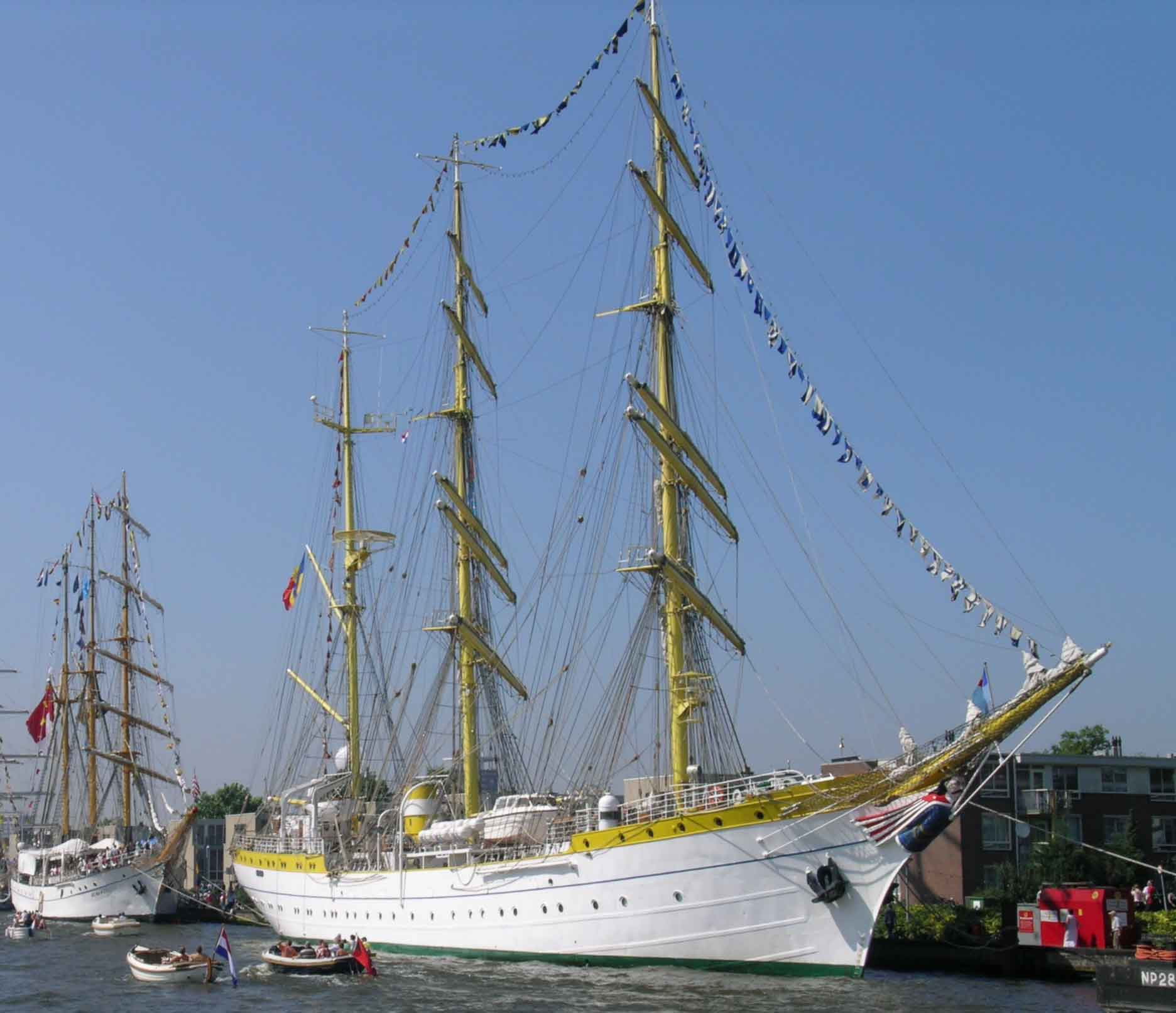
Mircea at SAIL Amsterdam 2005

Mircea was built by Blohm & Voss for the Romanian Navy. She was launched in 1938 and has always sailed under the Romanian flag (except for a short period after World War II, when she was confiscated by the Soviet Union). She is the only one of the sister ships that is truly identical to Gorch Fock. She was overhauled at the Blohm & Voss shipyards in Hamburg in 1966, and she still sails today.

=== Herbert Norkus ===
Named after the Hitler Youth martyr Herbert Norkus, another ship of the Gorch Fock design—with the same dimensions as Horst Wessel—was begun at the Blohm & Voss shipyard. However, the unfinished ship had to be launched prematurely on 7 November 1939 because the slipway had to be cleared to build submarines. The hull stayed in the harbor of Hamburg throughout World War II. It was damaged in a bomb raid in 1945, and instead of being sold to Brazil as had been considered, ended up being filled with gas grenades and sunk in the Skagerrak in 1947.

The yards, which had been prepared, but not yet mounted, and the tackle, which had not yet been rigged, were later used for Gorch Fock built in 1958.

=== Gorch Fock ===
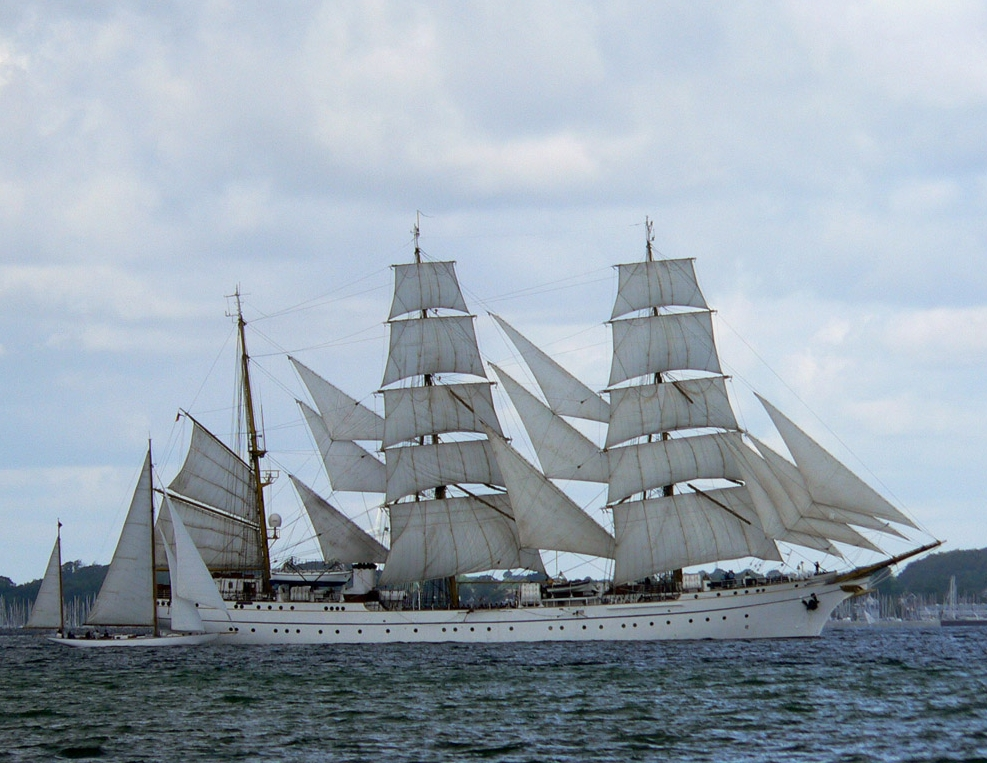
Gorch Fock of 1958

As Germany had lost all of its training vessels as war reparations after World War II, the West German Bundesmarine decided in 1957 to have a new training ship built following the plans for Gorch Fock. The new ship was a modernized rebuild of Horst Wessel. Coincidentally, her design had been influenced by another shipwreck: whereas the 1933 Gorch Fock was built in response to the Niobe disaster, the plans of SSS Gorch Fock were altered somewhat after the sinking of Pamir in 1957.

The modern-day Gorch Fock was launched on 23 August 1958 and commissioned on 17 December of that year.

=== Latin American ships ===
A number of similar ships have been built by the Astilleros Celaya S.A. shipyard in Bilbao for Latin American Navies, possibly following the Blohm & Voss design. The hulls and rigging of these ships are very similar, the main differences are in the superstructure and they also have larger tanks for both diesel and water, and they are also longer. These ships are Gloria (1967, Colombia), Guayas (1976, Ecuador), Simón Bolívar (1979, Venezuela), and Cuauhtémoc (1982, Mexico).
