= Rickmer Rickmers =

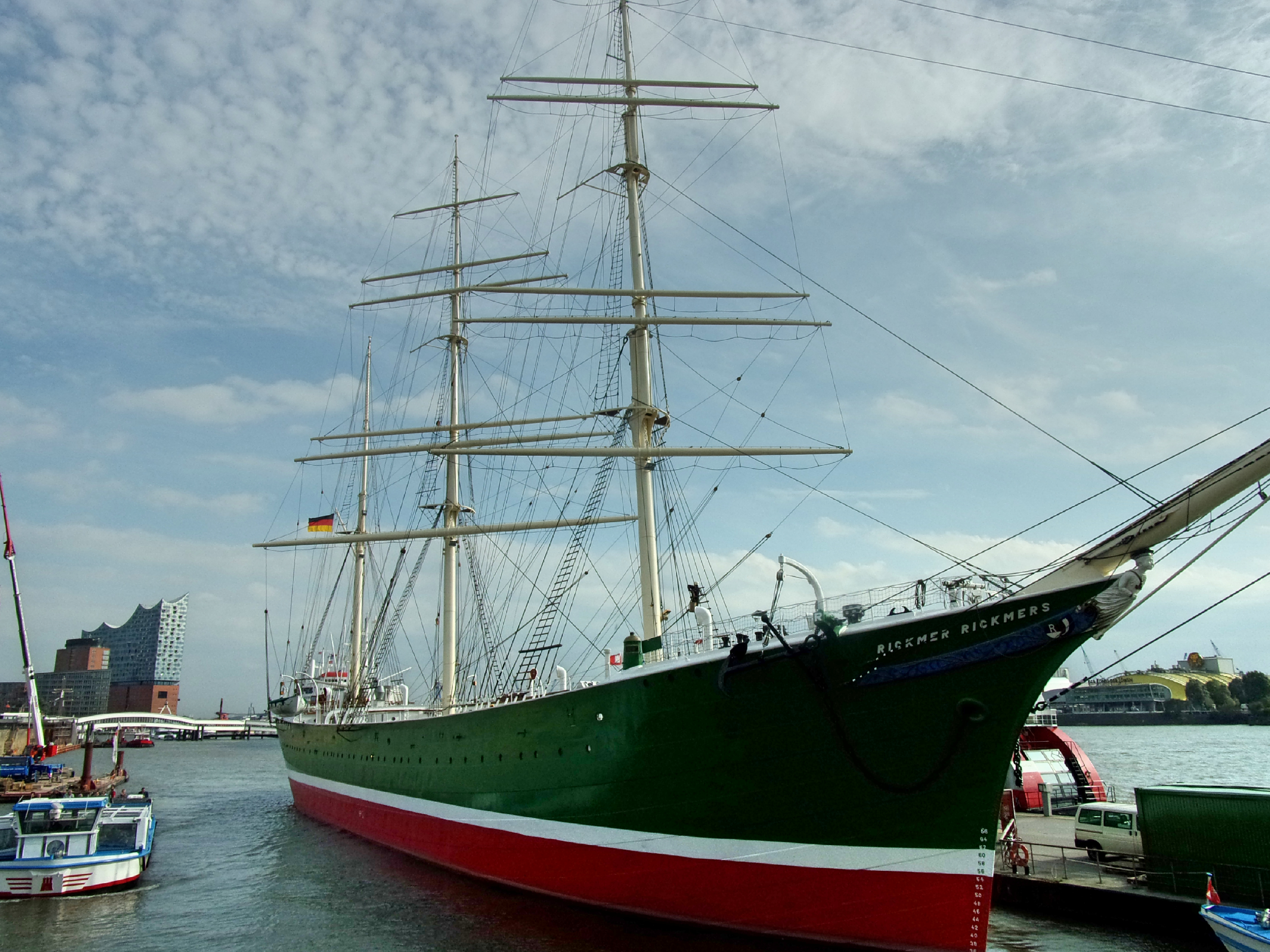

History

German Empire
- Name: Rickmer Rickmers
- Launched: August 1896
- Owner: Hamburger Reederei Carl Christian Krabbenhöft
- Acquired: 1912
- Renamed: Max
- Notes: Sailed in the saltpeter trade in Chile.

Portugal
- Name: Flores
- Captured: 1916
- Fate: Lent to the United Kingdom
- Notes: Seized in the Azores by the Portuguese authorities in 1916 and lent to the United Kingdom.

United Kingdom
- Name: Flores
- Acquired: 1916
- Fate: Returned to Portugal
- Notes: Lent by Portugal to the United Kingdom to be used as war transport. Returned to Portugal after the war.

Portugal
- Name: NRP Sagres
- Commissioned: 1924
- Decommissioned: 1975
- Renamed: NRP Santo André, 1962
- Fate: Transferred to Verein Windjammer für Hamburg e.V., Germany in 1983
- Notes: School ship for the Portuguese Navy. Victory over the Christian Radich in a 1958 sailing regatta.
- Notes: Hulked depot ship until 1983

Germany
- Name: Rickmer Rickmers
- Owner: Verein Windjammer für Hamburg e.V., Hamburg, Germany
- Acquired: 1983
- Status: Museum ship

General characteristics
- Class & type: Windjammer
- Tonnage: 1,980 GRT, 3,067 DWT
- Length: 97m
- Beam: 12.20 m
- Draft: 6 m
- Propulsion: Sails; steam engine; 350 hp Krupp diesel engines installed 1930
- Sail plan: Full-rigged ship, 2,600 m^{2} sail area

Rickmer Rickmers Museum
- Location of the Rickmer Rickmers Rickmer Rickmers (Germany)
- Established: 1983
- Location: Hamburg, Germany
- Coordinates: 53.5447°N 9.9725°E
- Type: Museum ship
- Website: www.rickmer-rickmers.de

Rickmer Rickmers is a sailing ship (three masted barque) permanently moored as a museum ship in Hamburg, near the Cap San Diego.

Rickmer Clasen Rickmers, (1807–1886) was a Bremerhaven shipbuilder and Willi Rickmer Rickmers, (1873–1965) led a Soviet-German expedition to the Pamirs in 1928.

Rickmer Rickmers was built in 1896 by the Rickmers shipyard in Bremerhaven, and was first used on the Hong Kong route carrying rice and bamboo. In 1912 she was bought by Carl Christian Krabbenhöft, renamed Max, and transferred to the Hamburg-Chile route.

In World War I Max was captured by the Government of Portugal, in Horta (Azores) harbour and loaned to the United Kingdom as a war aid. For the remainder of the war the ship sailed in British service, as Flores. After World War I she was returned to the Portuguese Government, becoming a Portuguese Navy training ship and was once more renamed, as NRP Sagres (the second of that name). In 1958, she won the Tall Ships' Race.

In the early 1960s Sagres (II) was retired from school ship service when the Portuguese Navy purchased, from Brazil, the school ship Guanabara (originally launched in Germany in 1937 as Albert Leo Schlageter). In 1962, the former Guanabara was commissioned as school ship with the name Sagres (III). At the same time Sagres (II) was renamed Santo André and reclassified as depot ship. The NRP Santo André remained moored at the Lisbon Naval Base, being decommissioned in 1975.

She was purchased in 1983 by an organisation named Windjammer für Hamburg e.V., renamed for the last time, back to Rickmer Rickmers, and turned into a floating museum ship.
