= German training ship Gorch Fock (1958) =

Training ship in the German Navy

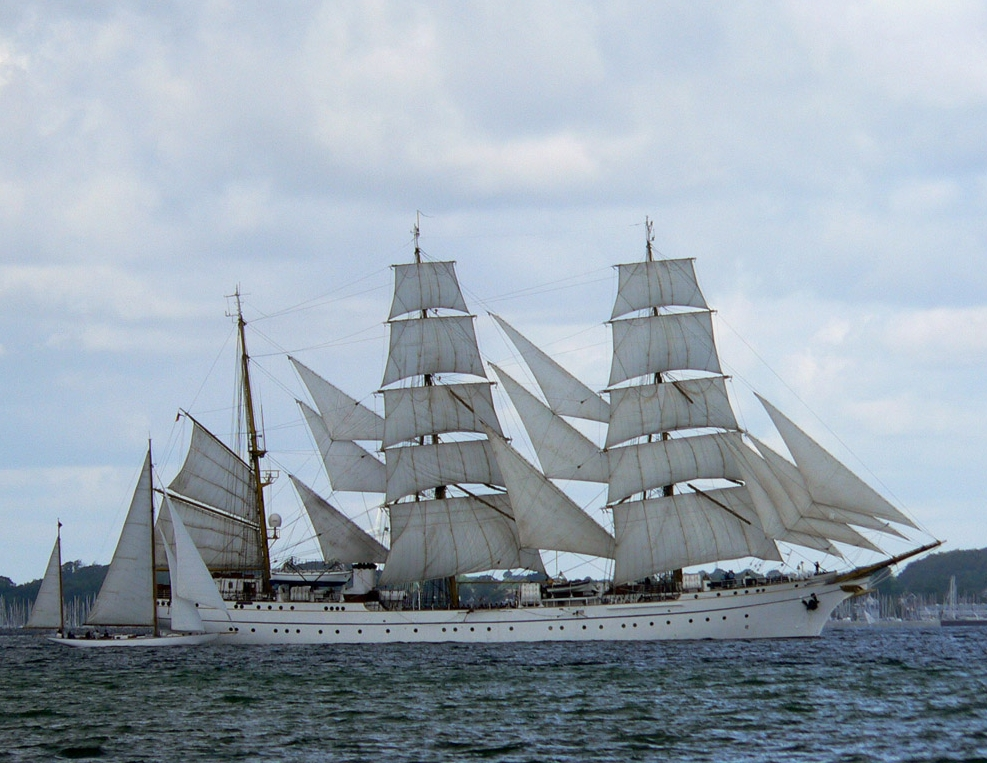

History

Germany
- Name: Gorch Fock
- Namesake: Johann Kinau, AKA "Gorch Fock"
- Owner: German Navy
- Builder: Blohm & Voss
- Yard number: 804
- Launched: 23 August 1958
- Commissioned: 17 December 1958
- Home port: Kiel
- Identification: NATO pennant number A60; IMO number: 5133644; Call sign: DRAX; MMSI number: 211210280
- Status: In active service

General characteristics
- Class & type: Type 441 training ship; Gorch Fock-class barque
- Displacement: 1760 tons
- Length: 81.2 m (266 ft 5 in)
- Beam: 12 m (39 ft 4 in)
- Draught: 5.2 m (17 ft 1 in)
- Installed power: 1,220 kW (1,640 hp)
- Propulsion: Sail, auxiliary six-cylinder diesel engine
- Sail plan: Three-masted barque
- Speed: 13.7 knots (25.4 km/h; 15.8 mph) under power

Gorch Fock is a tall ship of the German Navy, launched in 1958 as a replacement for the original Gorch Fock (1933) launched in 1933 which was taken as war reparations by the Soviet Union after World War II, renamed Tovarishch, and returned to Germany in 2003.

Both ships are named in honour of the German writer Johann Kinau who wrote under the pseudonym "Gorch Fock" and died in the battle of Jutland/Skagerrak in 1916. The modern-day Gorch Fock was launched in 1958 as a delayed sister ship to five ships built in the 1930s, and has since then undertaken 146 cruises (as of October 2006), including one tour around the world in 1988. She is sometimes referred to (unofficially) as Gorch Fock II to distinguish her from her older sister ship. Gorch Fock is assigned to the Naval Academy at Flensburg-Mürwik.

== The ship ==
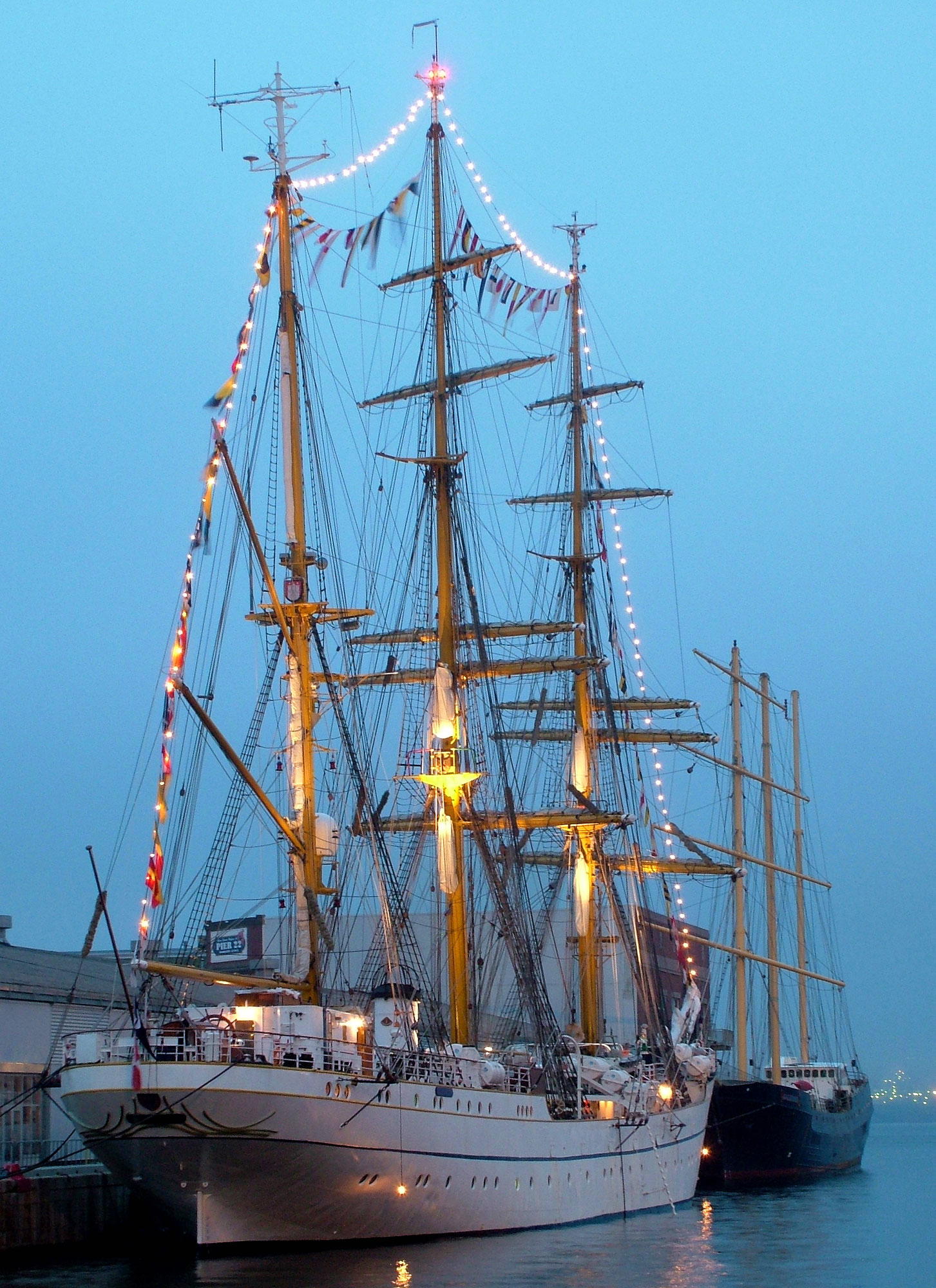
Gorch Fock at a pier in the evening

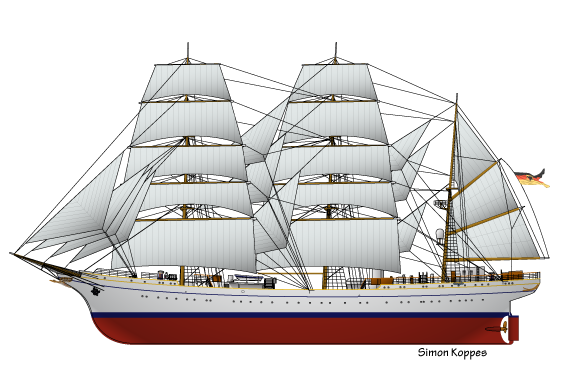
Line art of Gorch Fock

Germany lost all of its school ships as war reparations after World War II to the Allies, so the West German Bundesmarine decided in 1957 to have a new training vessel built following the plans for the original Gorch Fock of 1933 which by that time was owned by the Soviets, and renamed to Tovarishch. The new ship was a modernized repeat of the Albert Leo Schlageter, a slightly modified sister ship of the previous Gorch Fock.

The 1933 Gorch Fock had already been designed to be a very safe ship: she had a righting moment large enough to bring her back into the upright position even when heeling over to nearly 90°. Nevertheless, some last-minute changes to the design were made in response to the Pamir disaster in 1957, especially concerning the strength of the body and the bulkheads as well as the lifesaving equipment, including the lifeboats.

The new ship was built by Blohm & Voss at Hamburg, and launched on 23 August 1958. The vessel was commissioned on 17 December of that year. Her home port is Kiel. Gorch Fock is a three-masted barque with a steel hull 81.2 metres (266 ft 5 in) long (without the bowsprit) and 12 m (39 ft 4 in) wide. She has a draught of 5.2 m (17 ft 1 in) and a full load displacement of 1,760 tonnes (1,730 long tons). Originally, she carried 1,952 square metres (21,010 sq ft) of canvas sails; later, she received slightly larger sails made of synthetic materials. The tops of her fore and main masts can be lowered so that she can navigate the Kiel Canal, otherwise she would be too tall for some of the bridges spanning the canal. Officially Gorch Fock is a Type 441 naval ship with the NATO pennant number A60. Her international radio call sign is DRAX.

=== Renovations and repair problems ===
Over the years, various modernizations have been applied to the ship. She was fitted with air conditioning, the asbestos used originally was removed and replaced by less dangerous materials in 1991, and in that year she also received a new auxiliary engine, a six-cylinder diesel engine producing 1,220 kilowatts (1,640 hp), giving the ship a top speed of 13.7 knots (25.4 km/h; 15.8 mph) under power. The interior has also been modified multiple times; technological advances made it possible to reduce the size of the galley and enlarge the crew quarters.

In November 2015 the ship was brought to the German shipyard Elsflether Werft at Bremerhaven because of hull problems with a first cost estimate of 9.6 million euro. With the discovery of more problems the estimate was stepwise raised to 64.5 million euro within a year. Despite concerns about the rising costs the Ministry of Defense approved a continuation of the repairs. In 2017 it was determined that the amount of work required was much greater; this included the almost complete replacement of the hull plating, renewal of decks and refurbishment of the engine with a cost estimated at 135 million euro. In January 2018 repairs were stopped while a review was carried out by the Ministry of Defence, including consideration of replacing Gorch Fock with a new vessel. In March 2018 it was announced that the project would continue, noting that a new vessel could not be delivered until 2025, and that the existing vessel would re-enter service in 2019. However, in January 2019 the ship was reported to be in a "completely dismantled" state. A review by the Bundesrechnungshof (Federal Audit Office) was sharply critical of the procurement process by the Ministry of Defense. Also, at the end of January 2019, the executive board and the board of directors of the shipyard were released of their duty. While Gorch Fock was under repair, her Romanian sister ship Mircea was used for training.

On 1 September 2021 Gorch Fock took to sea for the first time in six years for her first trial run after her extensive renovations. On 30 September 2021 Gorch Fock returned to the German Navy.

== The figurehead ==
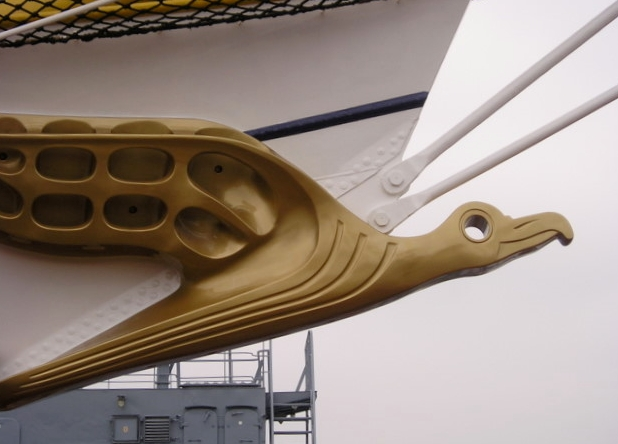
Gorch Fock's figurehead (2006)

The ship's figurehead was designed by Heinrich Schroeteler, a former World War II U-boat commander. The figurehead has been replaced on several occasions:

- The first albatross from 1958 was lost after a few years; its replacement was made of wood, like the original.
- In 1969, the replacement was removed and replaced by a figurehead made of polyester to save weight.
- This albatross broke off when Gorch Fock was being overhauled in 2000. It was replaced by a new one made of wood.
- On 11 December 2002, Gorch Fock's figurehead was lost in a storm. The replacement was also made of wood.
- Again, the figurehead broke off in a storm on 5 December 2003. On 24 February 2004, the ship was fitted with a new albatross, this time made of carbon fibre-reinforced polyester.

== The cruises ==
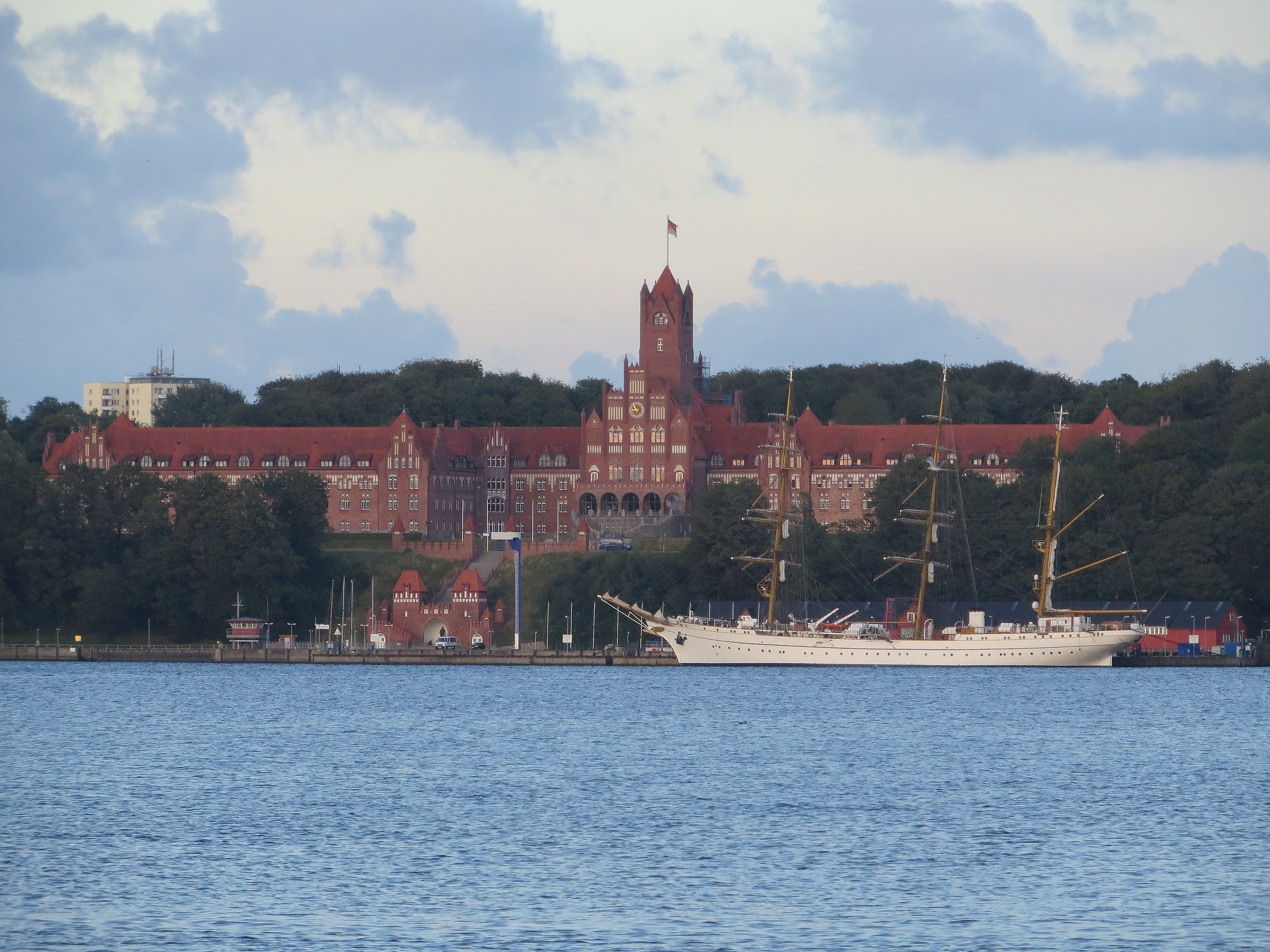
Gorch Fock in front of the Naval Academy Mürwik in Flensburg

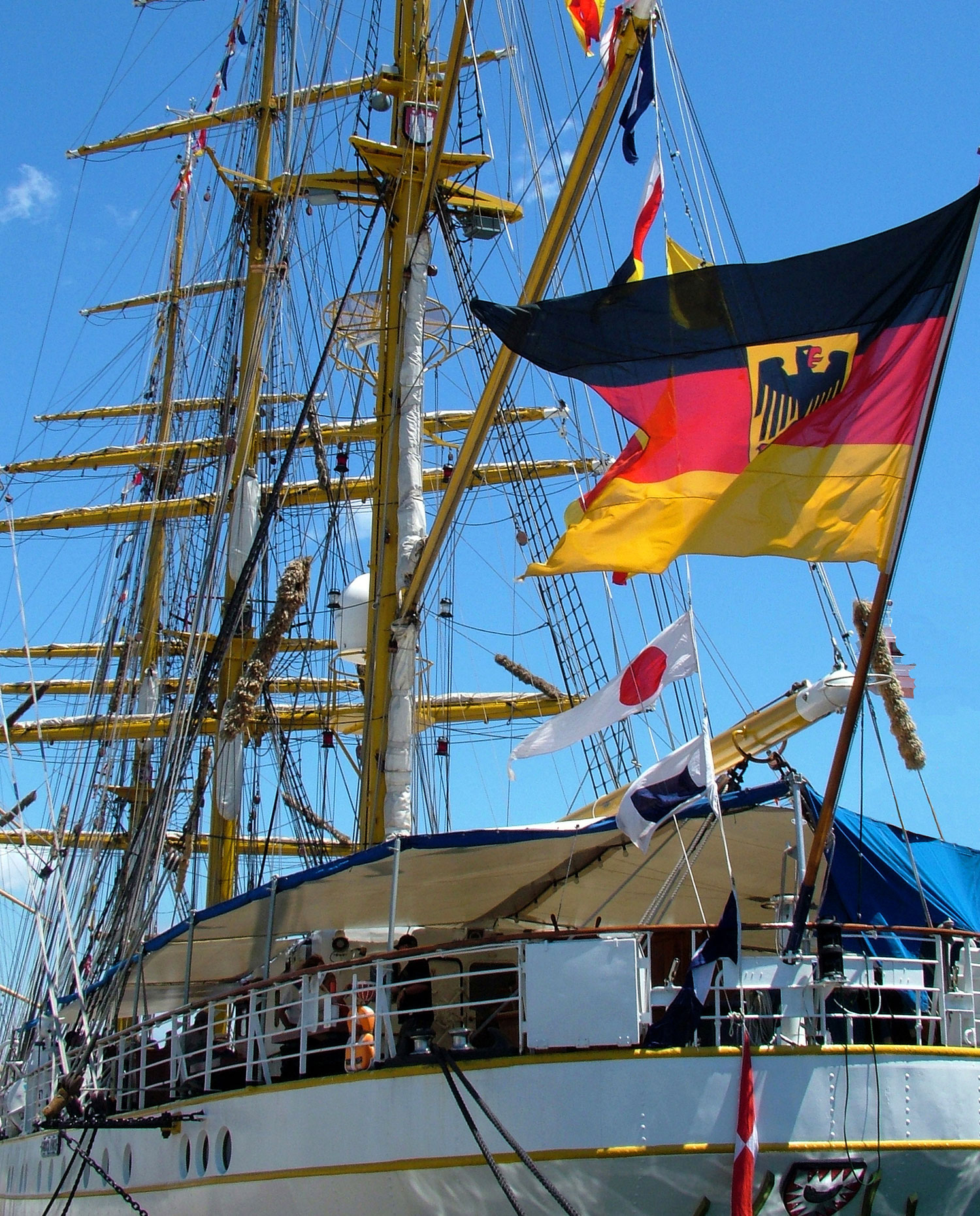
Stern view of Gorch Fock, showing the German naval ensign and the ship's rigging.

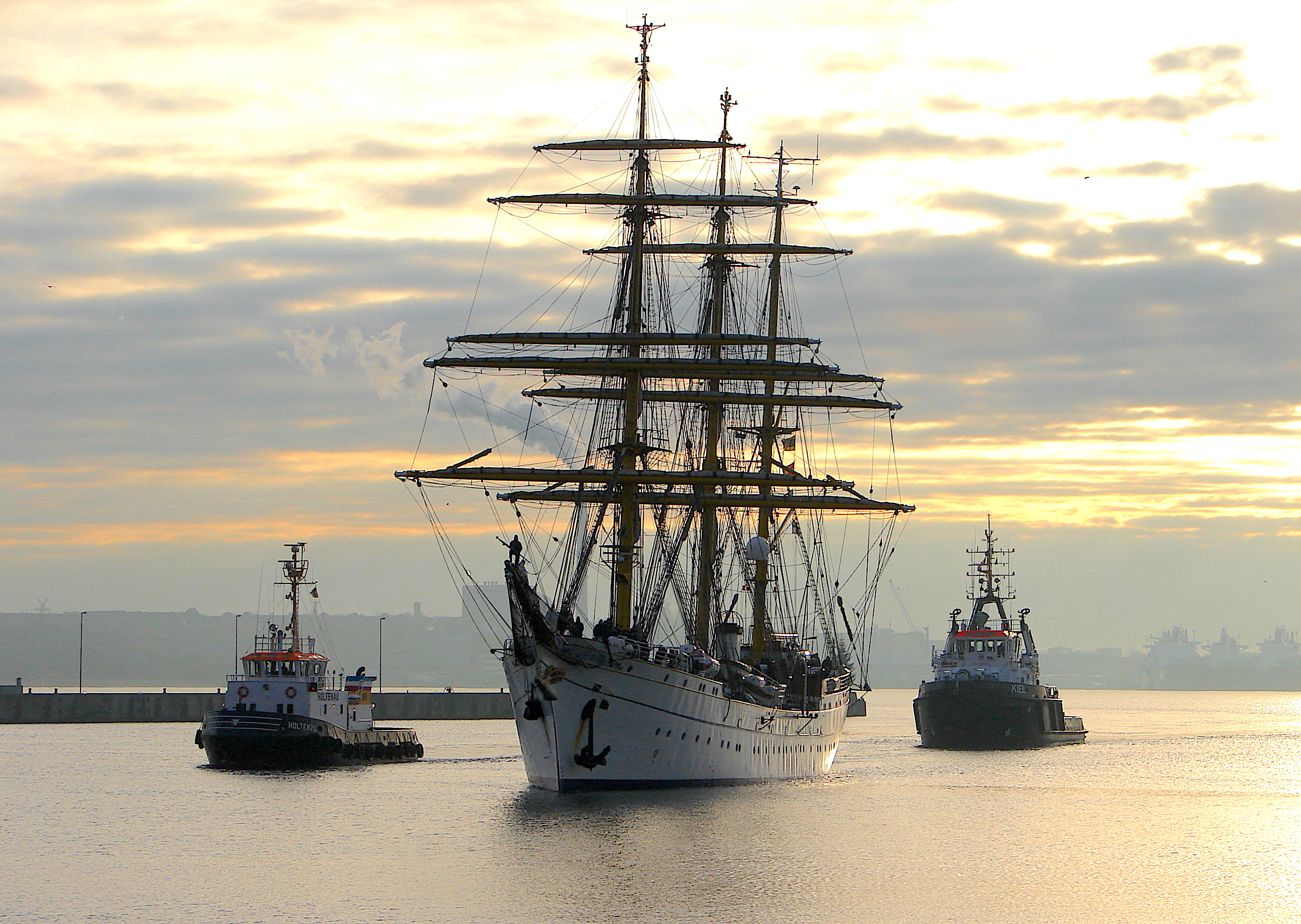
Return of Gorch Fock from a training cruise to home port Kiel (2009)

Gorch Fock has been in German Navy service as a training ship since 1958. Since she has been commissioned, more than 14,500 cadets have been trained on Gorch Fock. Gorch Fock participates in sailing parades and Tall Ships' Races, where she is in amicable rivalry with the Italian vessel Amerigo Vespucci. Other ships of the same class include USCGC Eagle, NRP Sagres, the first Gorch Fock and Mircea. Gorch Fock can host up to 350 passengers on board.

In 1987–1988, she sailed around the world, with stopovers on five continents. Lasting 336 days, this was her second longest cruise, topped only by a training cruise in 1996–1997 from Kiel to Bangkok and back that lasted 343 days.

At least six sailors have died in incidents aboard Gorch Fock, either by falling from the rigging or by going overboard. In the aftermath of the latest accident, naval cadets refused to climb the rigging (the highest position on the main mast being 45 metres or 148 feet), and four of them were subsequently accused of "inciting rebellion". This was described as a mutiny in some accounts. Subsequently, officers' training on board Gorch Fock was suspended, pending a thorough review of training protocols as well as the entire training program. According to a 19 November 2010 statement issued by the German Fleet Command, the officer candidates then on board were to be flown back to Germany to continue their training while the ship was docked in Ushuaia, Argentina. The commanding officer was suspended, and a commission was appointed to investigate claims of sexual harassment and improper conduct. On 13 March 2011, all charges against the commanding officer were dismissed.
