= Gorch Fock (author) =

German writer (1880–1916)

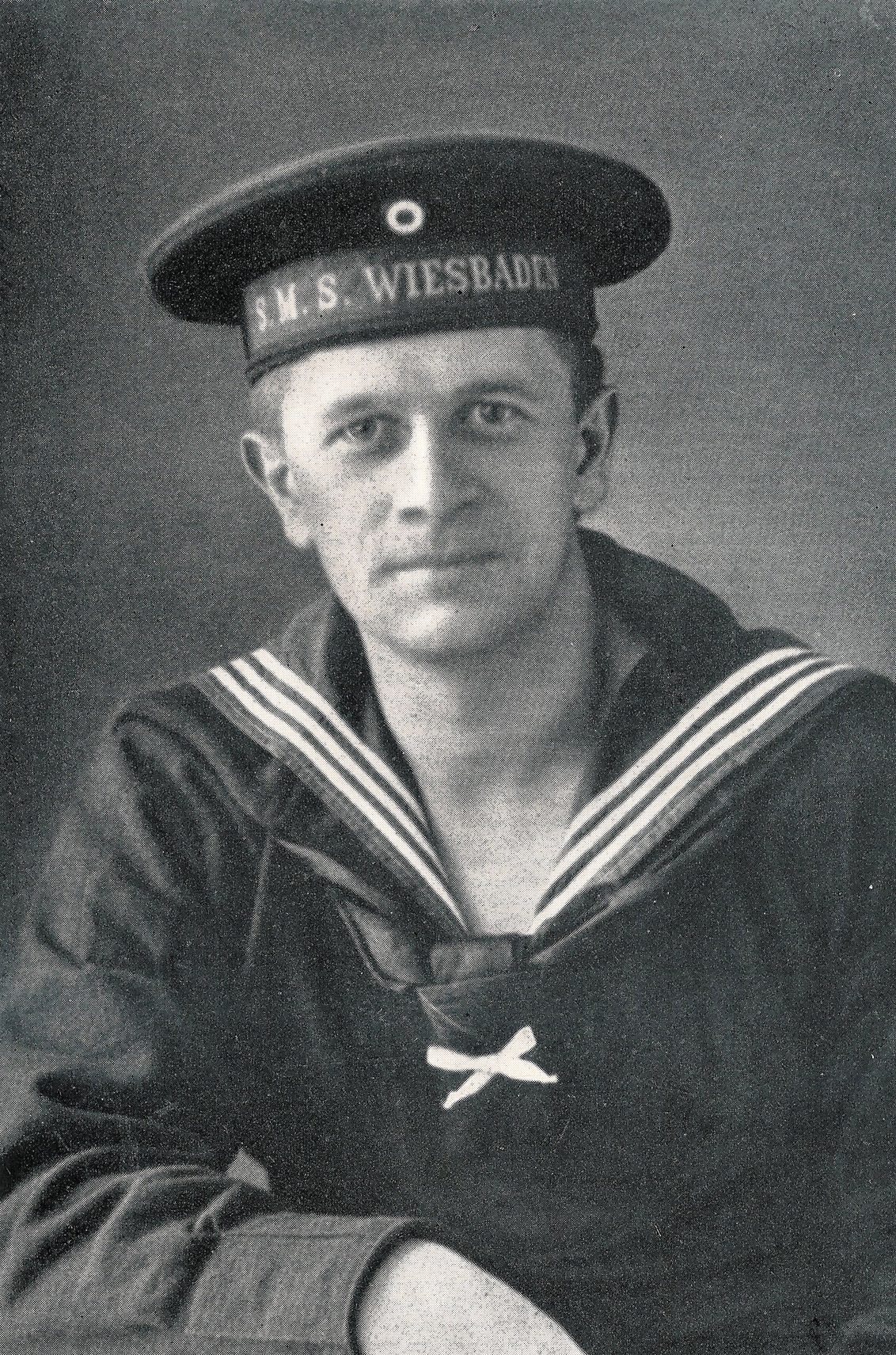
- Gorch Fock
- Born: Johann Wilhelm Kinau; 22 August 1880; Finkenwerder, Kingdom of Prussia, German Empire
- Died: 31 May 1916 (aged 35); SMS Wiesbaden, North Sea
- Other names: Jakob Holst and Giorgio Focco
- Occupation: author
- Known for: Seefahrt ist Not!

Johann Wilhelm Kinau (22 August 1880 – 31 May 1916), better known by his pseudonym Gorch Fock (German pronunciation: [ɡɔʀx fɔk]), was a German author. Other pseudonyms he used were Jakob Holst and Giorgio Focco.

== Life ==
Kinau was the eldest child of fisherman Heinrich Wilhelm Kinau and his wife, Metta Holst, on the Elbe island of Finkenwerder (now part of Hamburg). In 1895 he was apprenticed to his uncle, the merchant August Kinau in Geestemünde (today part of Bremerhaven), and from 1897 until 1898 he attended a commercial school in Bremerhaven. Later he was employed as an accountant in Meiningen, Bremen, Halle (Saale) and from 1907 at the shipping company Hamburg-Amerika-Linie in Hamburg. He married Rosa Elisabeth Reich in 1908, with whom he had three children. In 1904, Kinau started publishing poetry and stories in his native Low German dialect. In 1913, he published his most popular work, the novel Seefahrt ist Not!, in which he describes the life of the deep sea fishermen of his home island.

In the First World War, Kinau was drafted into the German infantry in 1915. He fought in Serbia and Russia and later at Verdun. From 1916 he served in the German Navy, having requested the transfer. He served as a lookout on the light cruiser SMS Wiesbaden and died when the ship was sunk in the Battle of Jutland. His body was found on the Swedish shore on the island Väderöbod midsummer's eve 1916 near Fjällbacka. He was later buried on the island of Stensholmen together with other German and British servicemen. He was recognised by carrying a poem, "Letzter Wunsch", which predicted his demise, in a hermetically sealed box in his pocket:

Letzter Wunsch / Sterb ich auf der stolzen See, / gönnt Gorch Fock ein Seemansgrab. / Bringt mich nicht zum Kirchhof hin, / senkt mich tief ins Meer hinab. / Segelmacher näh mich ein. / Steuermann, ein Bibelwort. / Junge, nimm deine Mütze mal ab... / Und dann sinnig über Bord...

Int Morgenrot, int Morgenrot / sleit Michel de Franzosen dot; / tor middagstied, tor middagstied / fegt he de Russen an de Siet; / un in de Obendschummeree / smitt he de Briten in de See!

— Gorch Fock

In 1938, his widow was invited to take part in the first voyage of M/V Wilhelm Gustloff to Madeira.

The German Navy named two training windjammers in his honor, the Gorch Fock of the Kriegsmarine and the Gorch Fock of the Deutsche Marine. Gorch-Fock-Wall on the Hamburg Wallring is also named after him.

== Burial ==
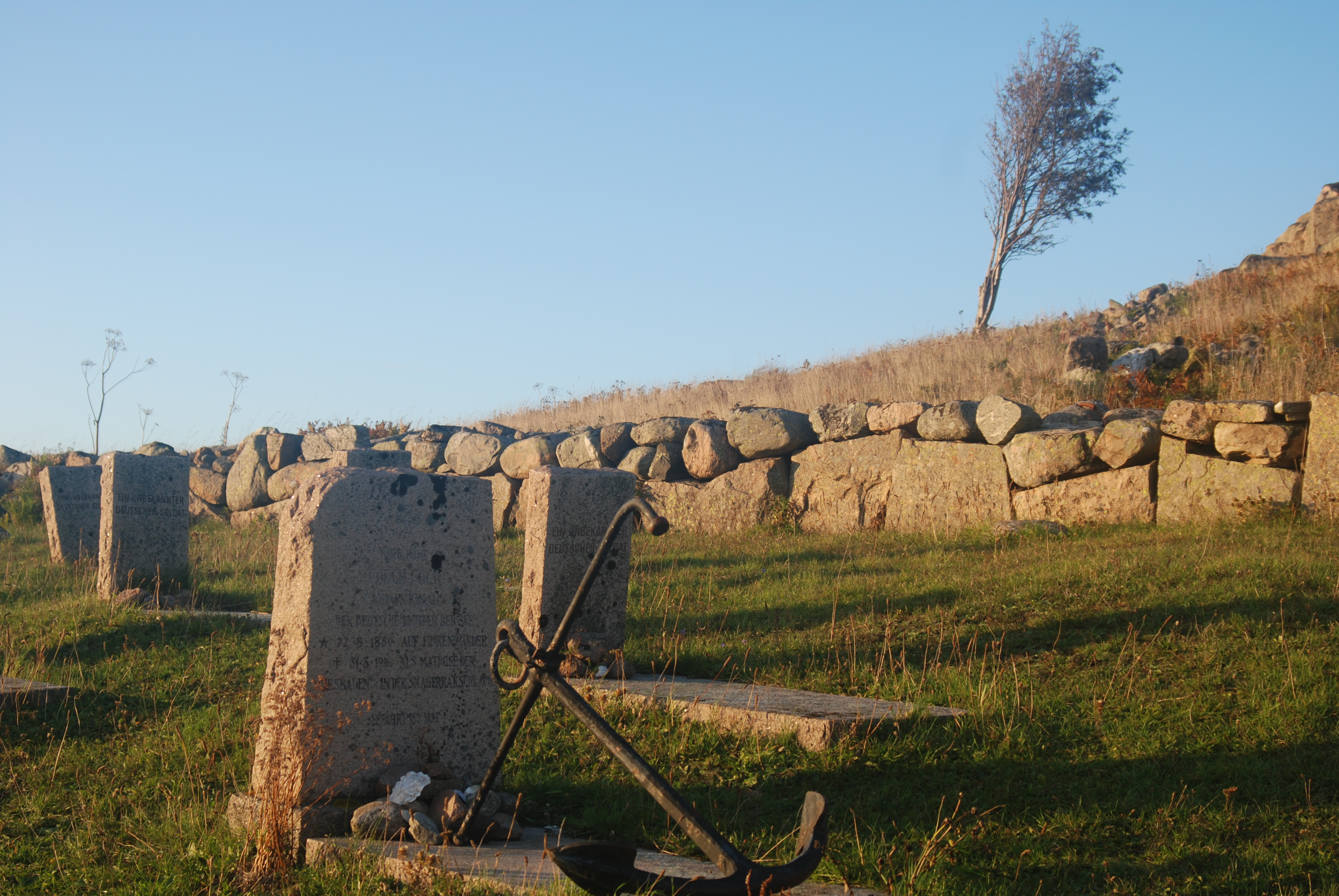
Gorch Fock's grave on Stensholmen, Bohuslän.

Gorch Fock is buried on the Stensholmen in Bohuslän the northernmost part of the Swedish west coast. He was buried in the War cemetery on Stensholmen in 1920 by the pastor C. Norborg in Fjällbacka alongside two British and thirteen German sailors found dead in the archipelago and brought to land by local fishermen.

== Works ==
- 1910 Schullengrieper und Tungenkrieper
- 1911 Hein Godenwind
- 1913 Hamborger Janmaten
- 1913 Seefahrt ist Not! (ISBN 3-499-14148-5)
- 1914 Fahrensleute
- 1914 Cilli Cohrs (play)
- 1914 Doggerbank (play)
- 1914–15 War poems in Plattdüütsch
- 1918 (posthumously) Sterne überm Meer (Diary notes and poems)
