= Naval Review =

Parade and review of the US Fleet

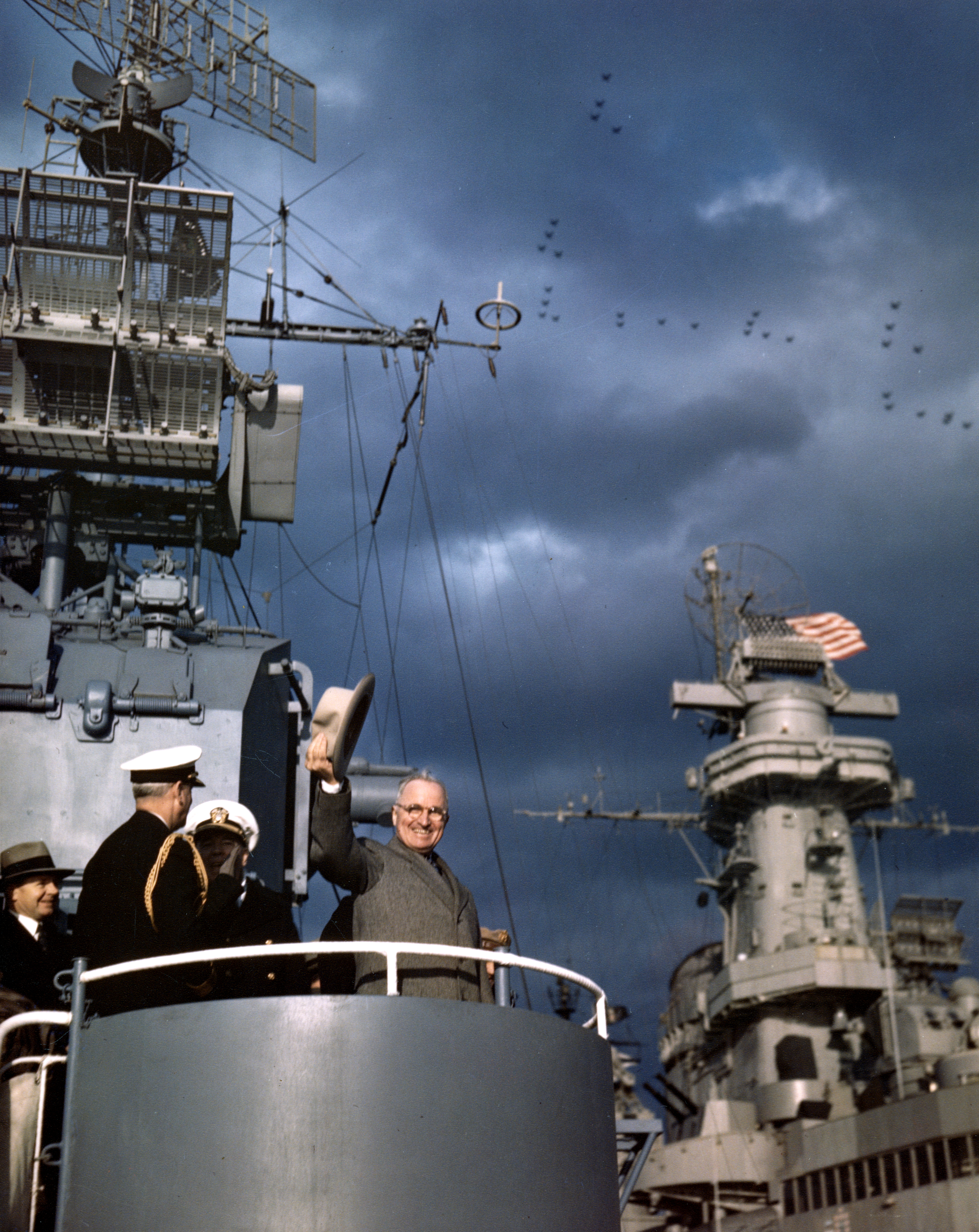
President Harry S. Truman (waving his hat) with his party on board USS Renshaw during the Navy Day Fleet Review in New York Harbor, 27 October 1945. USS Missouri is in the right background, and Navy planes are flying in formation overhead.

A Naval Review is an event where select vessels and assets of the United States Navy are paraded to be reviewed by the President of the United States or the Secretary of the Navy. Due to the geographic distance separating the modern U.S. Navy and the deployment rotations of a various ships within a fleet, it would be exceedingly difficult to imagine a situation where even an entire numbered fleet could be presented at one event, to say nothing of the physical cost and logistical requirements to support over 460 ships exceeding 3.4 million tons displacement.

A naval review can also include warships and delegates from other national navies. The largest modern maritime exercise regularly being conducted by the US Navy is the Rim of the Pacific Exercise (RIMPAC), held biennially during the summer on even-numbered years off the coast of Hawaii. It typically sees the participation of around 50 ships and 200 aircraft, from 2 dozen nations with some 25,000 personnel, culminating in a massive naval review often attended by the Secretary of the Navy, joining the Commander, U.S. Indo-Pacific Command, Commander, U.S. Pacific Fleet, and other invited dignitaries.

Following is a list of select past Naval Reviews, by President. Each was reviewed by the President, unless otherwise noted.

== Nineteenth century ==
=== Grover Cleveland ===
- Apr to June 1893, at Hampton Roads – International Naval Review, part of the Columbian Exposition – President on board the despatch vessel USS Dolphin, with the following other U.S. naval vessels present:
  - USS Atlanta
  - USS Bennington
  - USS Charleston
  - USS Chicago (1885)

== Before World War One ==
=== Theodore Roosevelt ===
- 1903 at Oyster Bay, New York – Presidential Fleet Review
- 2–4 September 1906, Oyster Bay, New York – U.S. naval vessels included:
  - USS Florida
  - USS Truxtun
  - USS Yankee
- 10 June 1907 – Presidential Review, from Fort Monroe as part of Jamestown Exposition which laid the groundwork for Naval Station, Norfolk – U.S. naval vessels included USS Georgia, from which 11 June was proclaimed "Georgia Day"
- 16 December 1907, Hampton Roads – Send-off for the Great White Fleet, which included USS Georgia, 15 other battleships, a torpedo boat squadron and transports, USS Truxtun
- 6–8 May 1908, San Francisco Bay, reviewed by Secretary of the Navy, which included the following units of the Pacific Fleet:
  - USS California
  - USS Georgia
  - USS Washington
  - USS Wisconsin
- 22 February 1909, Hampton Roads – Return of the Great White Fleet, which included the following vessels:
  - USS Idaho
  - USS New Hampshire
  - USS Wisconsin

=== William Howard Taft ===
- 2 November 1910 – Before departure for France
- early November 1911, New York – U.S. naval vessels included:
  - USS South Carolina
  - USS Washington
- 1 April 1912, off Yonkers, New York, which included USS Wisconsin
- 14 October 1912, North River – USS Delaware and USS E-1 passed before the President and the Secretary of the Navy George von L. Meyer
- 10 – 15 October 1912, Philadelphia – USS Iowa (BB-4)

== 1914 – 1919: Woodrow Wilson ==
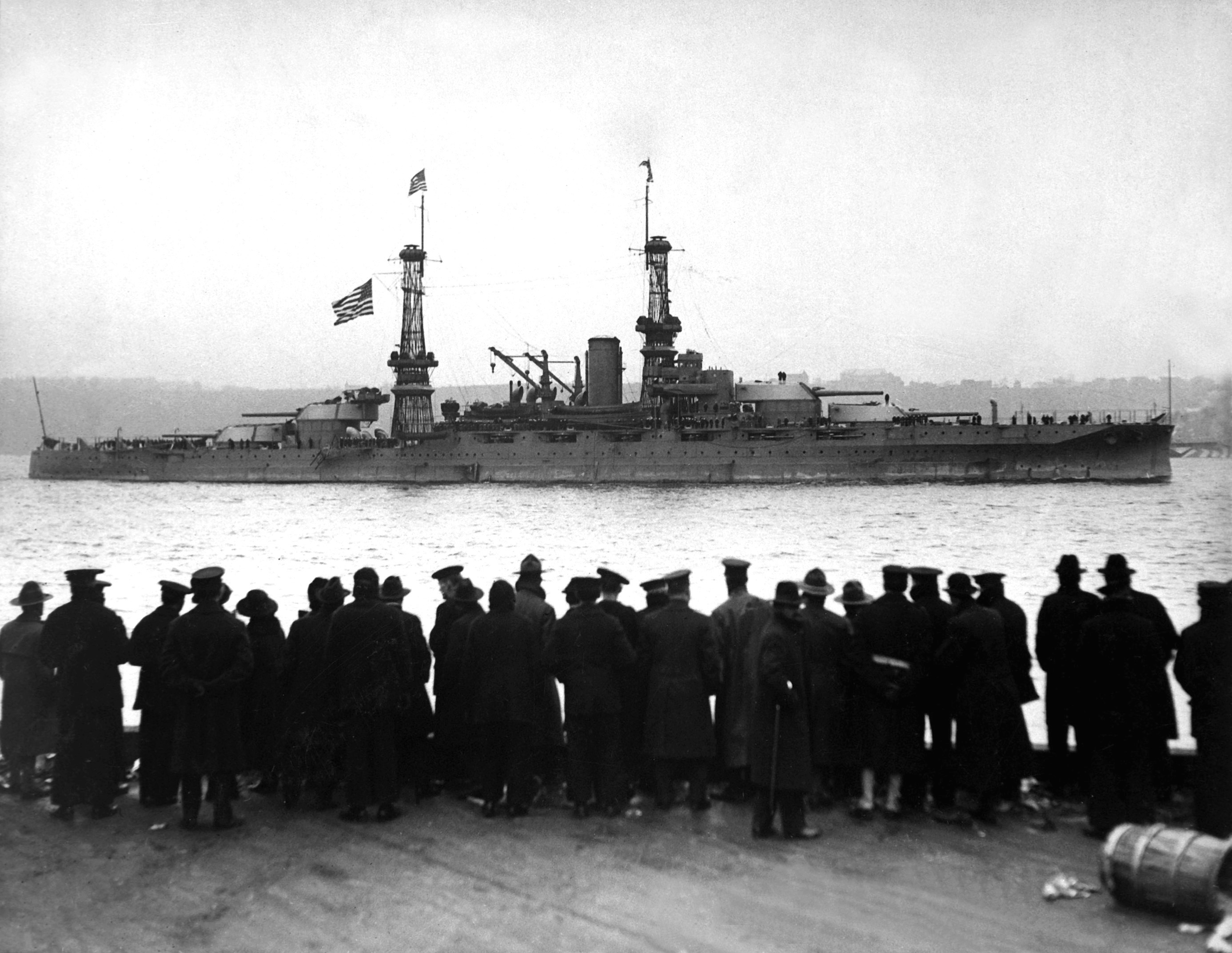
USS Arizona at the New York City review, 26 December 1918. She was the first of ten dreadnoughts to parade past Secretary of the Navy Josephus Daniels.

- May 1915, New York Harbor – inc. USS G-4
- 26 December 1918 – New York – reviewed by Secretary of the Navy Josephus Daniels from the deck of the yacht USS Mayflower and Assistant Secretary of the Navy Franklin Delano Roosevelt from USS Aztec, which also included USS Wisconsin
- September 1919, San Francisco, including USS Crane (during which she was visited by Secretary of the Navy Josephus Daniels on 4 September) and USS Dent
- 12 September 1919, Seattle, Washington – U.S. naval vessels included USS Seattle
- late December 1919, North River – Victory Naval Review – U.S. naval vessels included USS Florida

== Inter-war ==
=== Warren G. Harding ===
- 28 April 1921, Hampton Roads – Reviewed by President Warren G. Harding, which included the following U.S. naval vessels:
  - USS Delaware
  - USS Dickerson
- April 1921, Norfolk, Virginia, which included the following U.S. naval vessels:
  - USS Graham
  - USS Dahlgren
- 1923, Seattle, Washington, which included USS Arizona and USS Chase

=== Calvin Coolidge ===
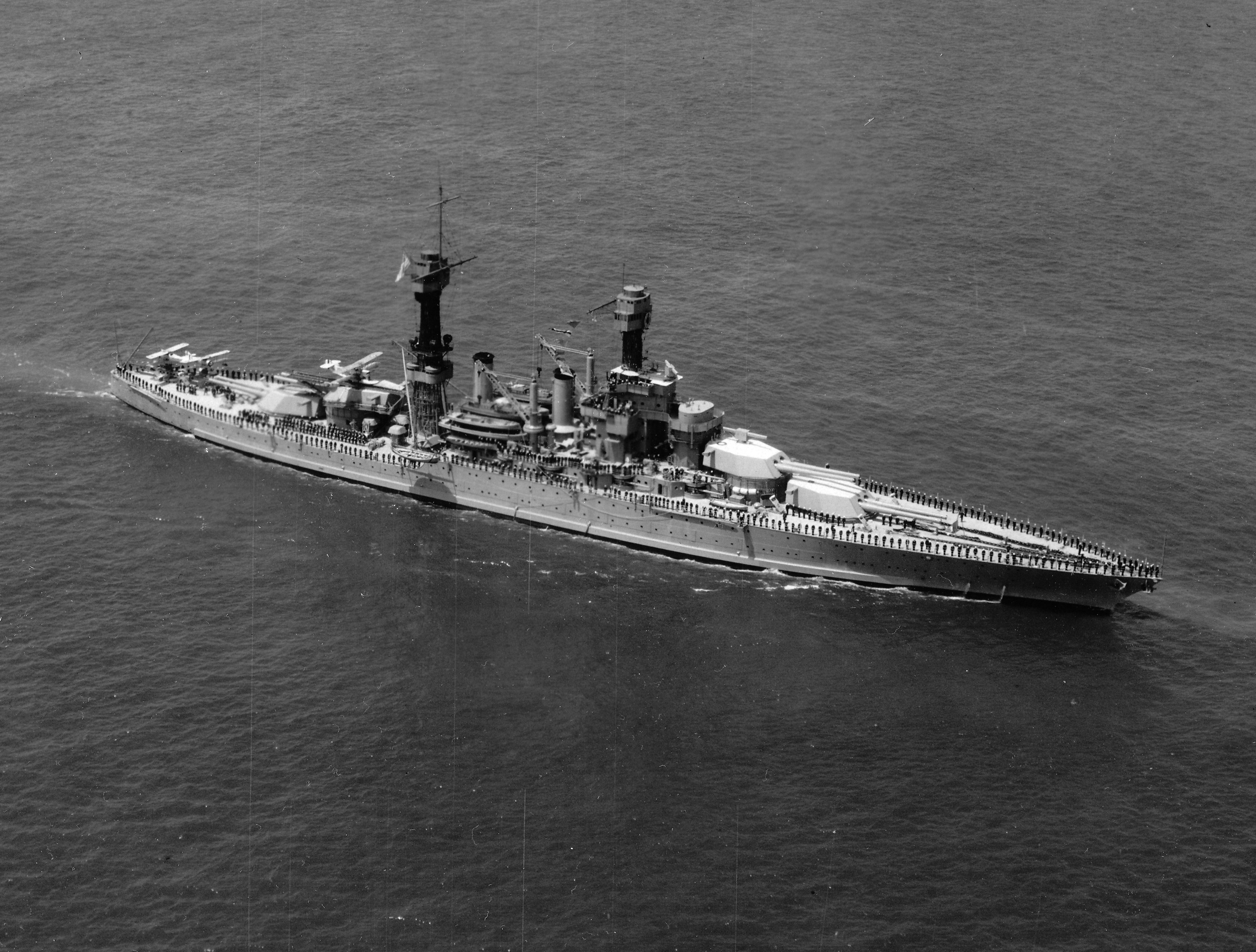
USS Maryland during the June 1927 review

- June 1927, Hampton Roads – Naval vessels included:
  - USS Seattle
  - USS Concord
  - USS La Vallette
  - USS Somers
  - USS Camden
  - USS Coghlan

=== Franklin D. Roosevelt ===
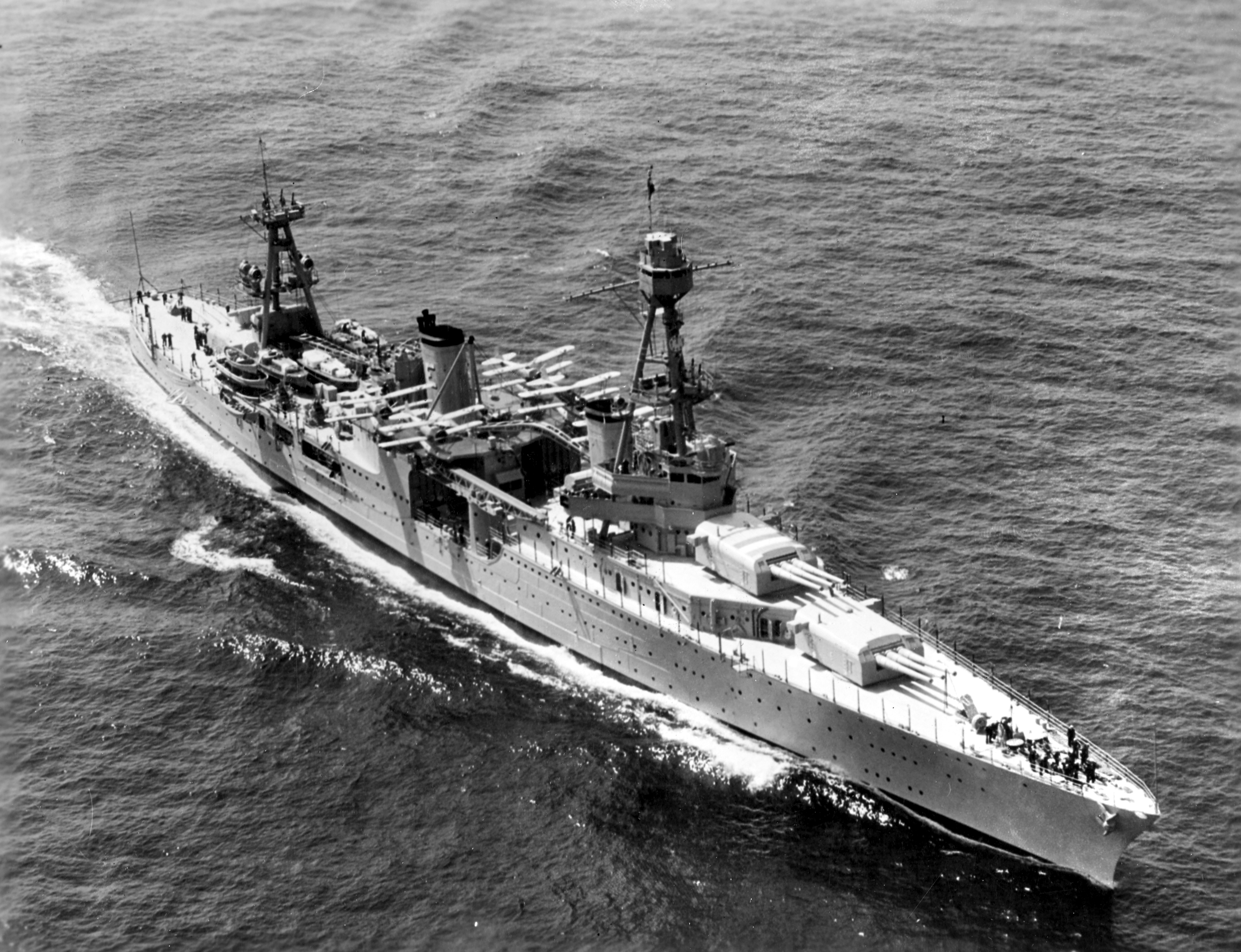
USS Chicago (CA-29) underway off New York City, during 31 May 1934 fleet review.

- 31 May 1934, New York Harbor, which included the following U.S. naval vessels:
  - USS Chicago (CA-29)
  - USS Salt Lake City
  - USS Dickerson
  - USS Chester
- September–November 1935, San Diego, California which included the following U.S. naval vessels:
  - USS Philip
  - USS Crowninshield
  - USS Concord
- 12 – 14 July 1938, San Francisco, California – USS Houston carried President Roosevelt and also included USS Concord.

== 1940 to 1945 ==
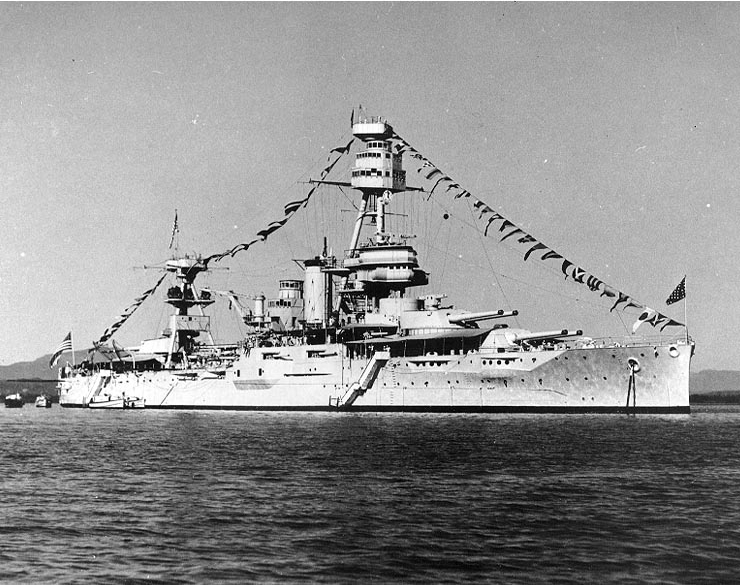
USS Texas, 1940 review

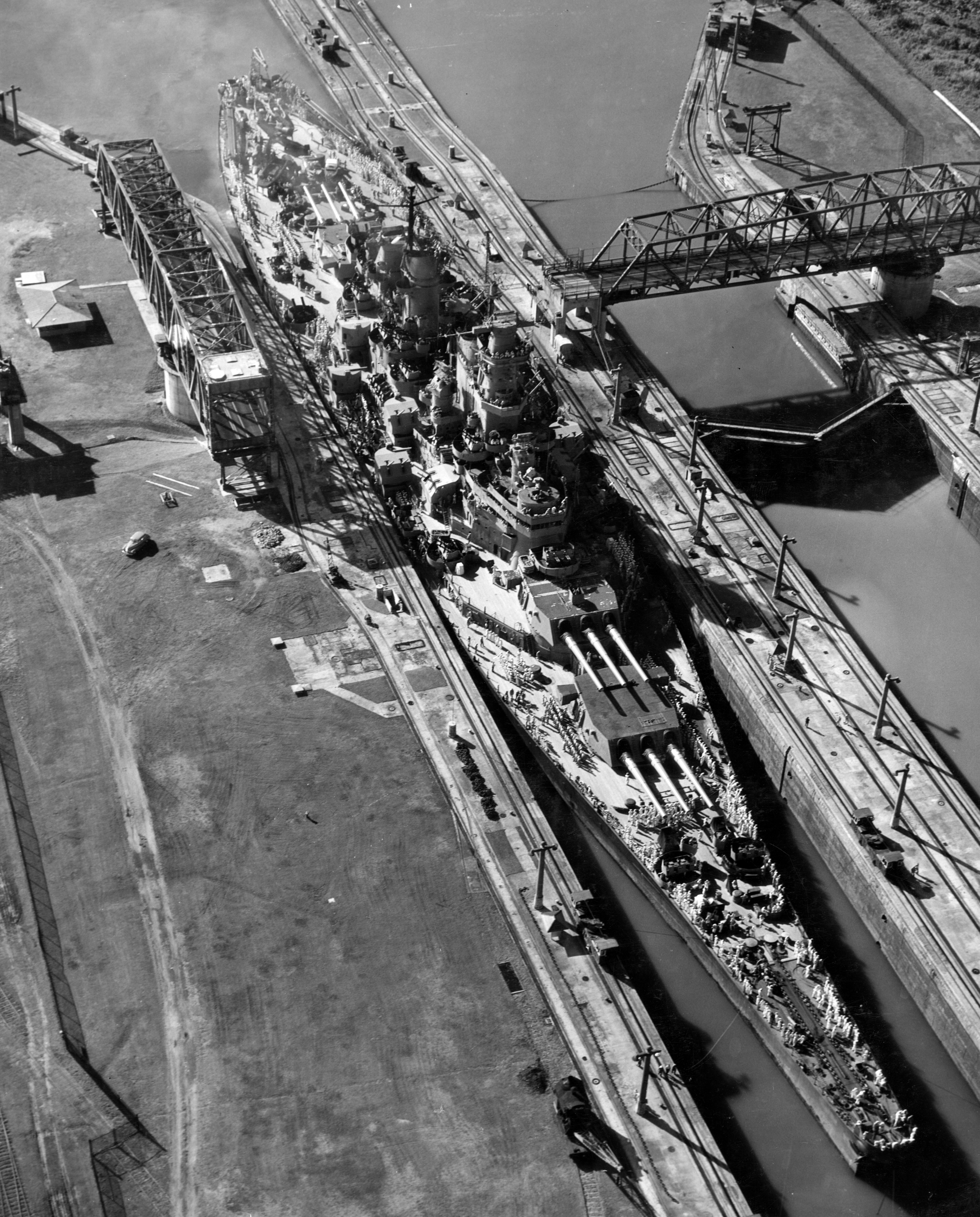
USS Missouri in the Panama Canal en route to the 1945 review

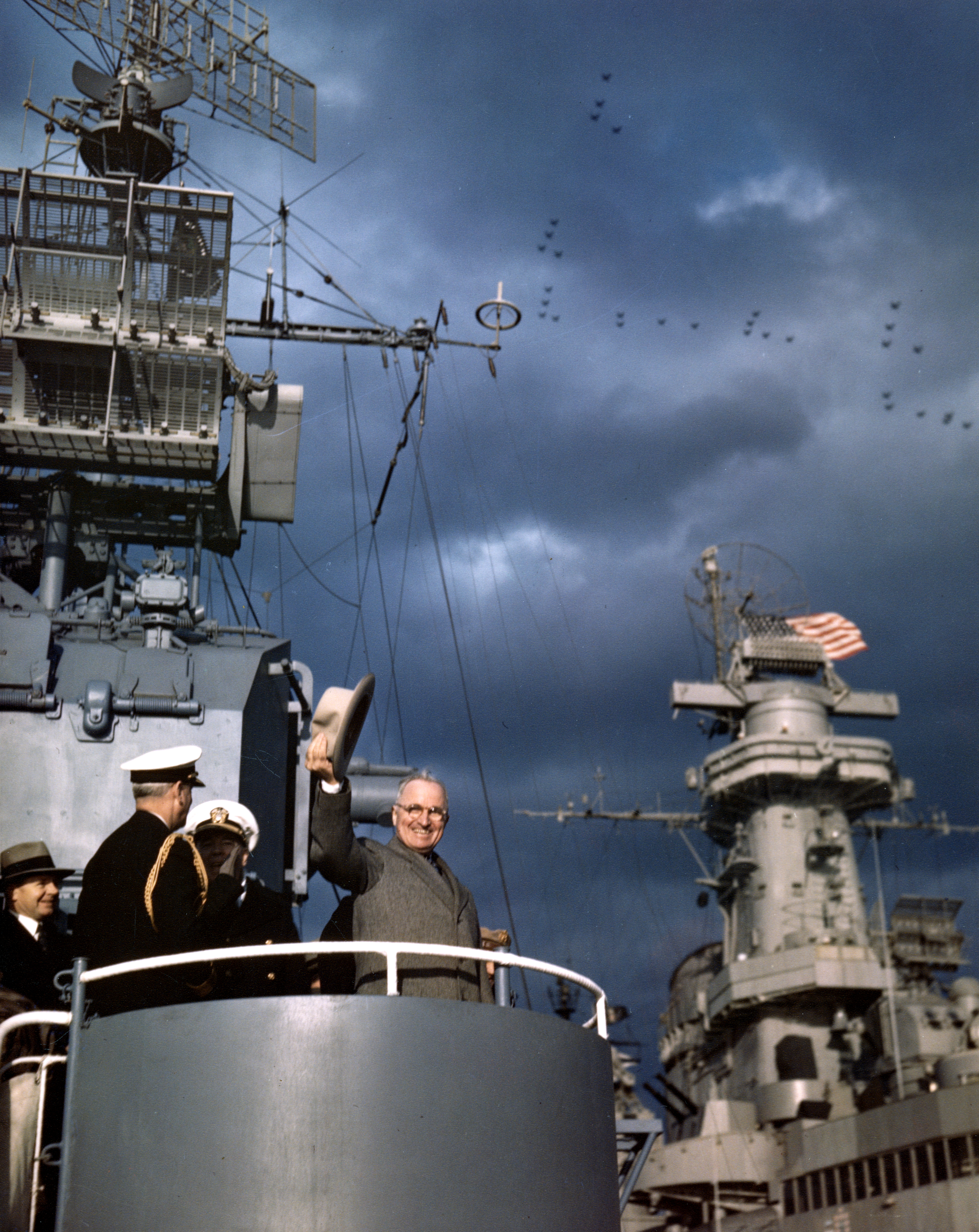
Truman, 1945 review

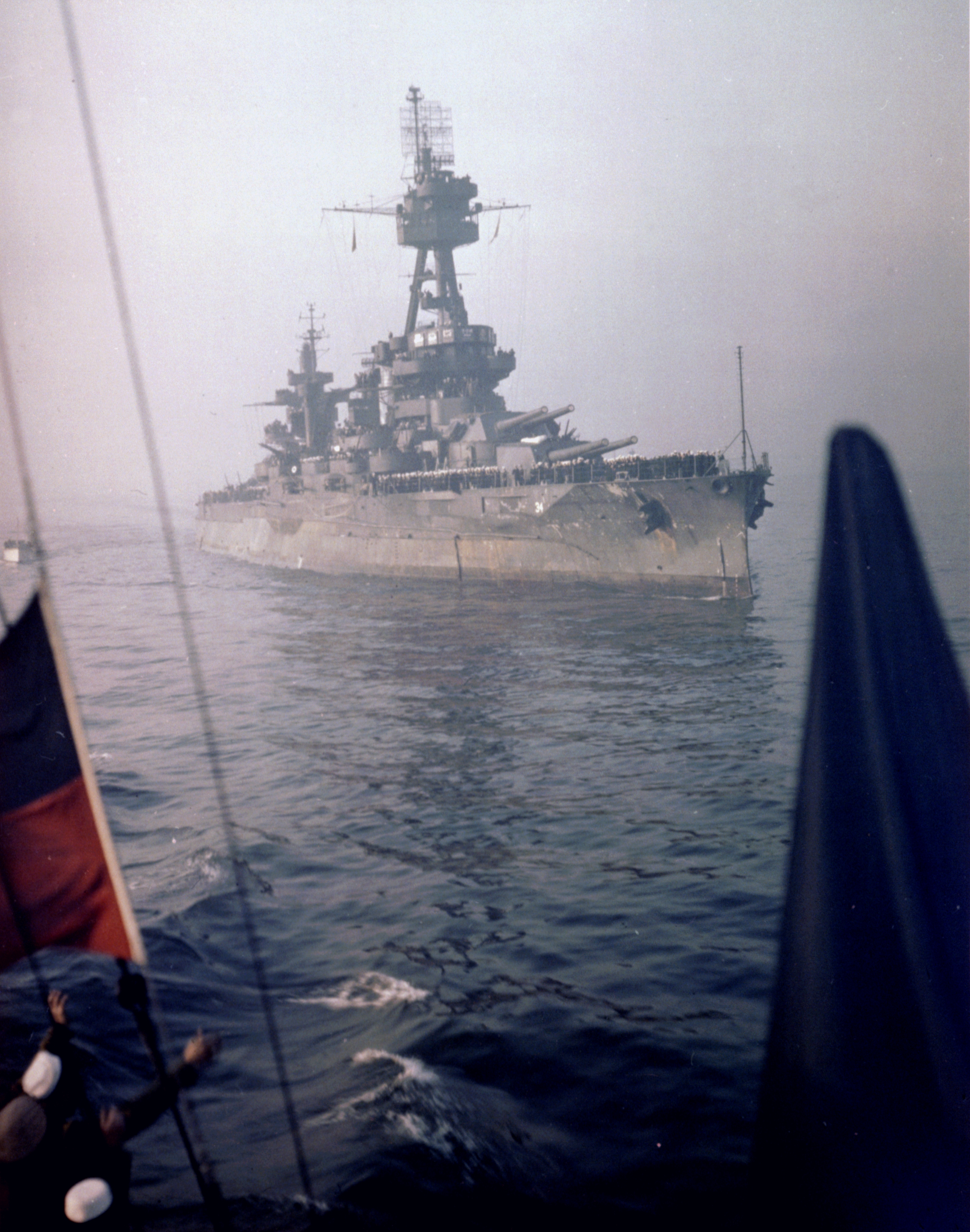
USS New York at the 1945 review
- Navy Day, 27 October 1940

=== Harry S. Truman ===
- Navy Day Fleet Review in New York Harbor, 27 October 1945

== Post-war to present ==
=== Dwight Eisenhower ===
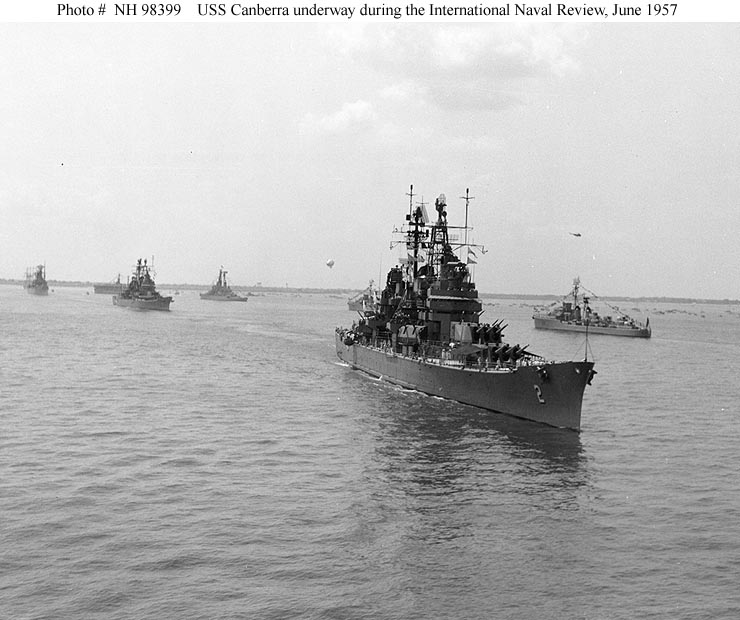
International Naval Review – 1957

11 – 13 June 1957, Hampton Roads – International Naval Review on 350th anniversary of founding of Jamestown, Virginia, which involved 113 ships from seventeen nations, including the French anti-aircraft cruiser De Grasse and the following U.S. naval vessels:

- USS Saratoga
- USS Iowa (BB-61)
- USS Canberra – Secretary of Defense Charles E. Wilson embarked
- USS Macon
- USS Albany
- USS Northampton
- USS Norfolk – Flagship for Admiral Jerauld Wright, Commander-in-Chief U.S. Atlantic Fleet and Supreme Allied Commander Atlantic
- USS Forrest Royal
- USS Charles H. Roan
- USS Hyman
- USS Hunt
- USS Donner
- USS Ray
- USS Cavalla
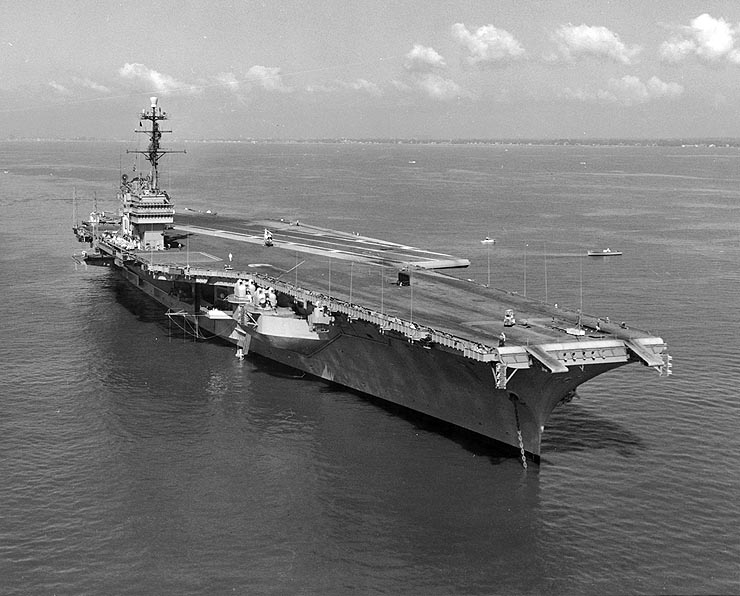
USS Saratoga

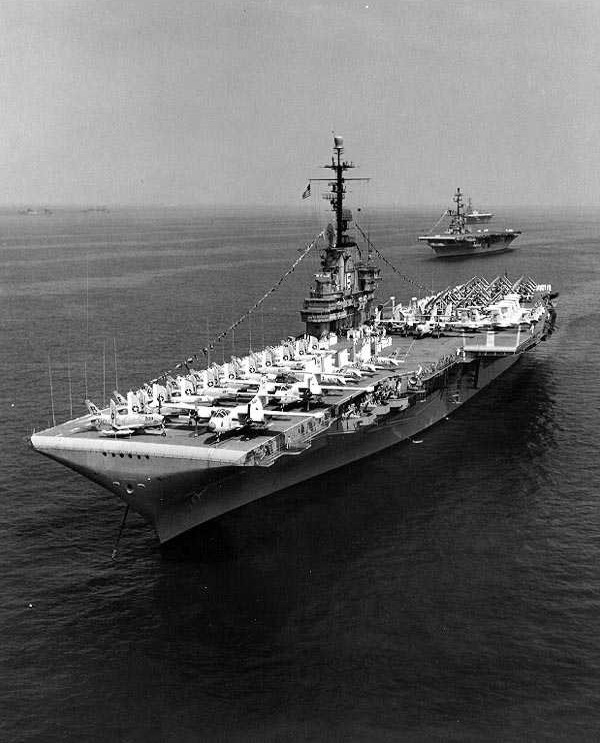
USS Randolph

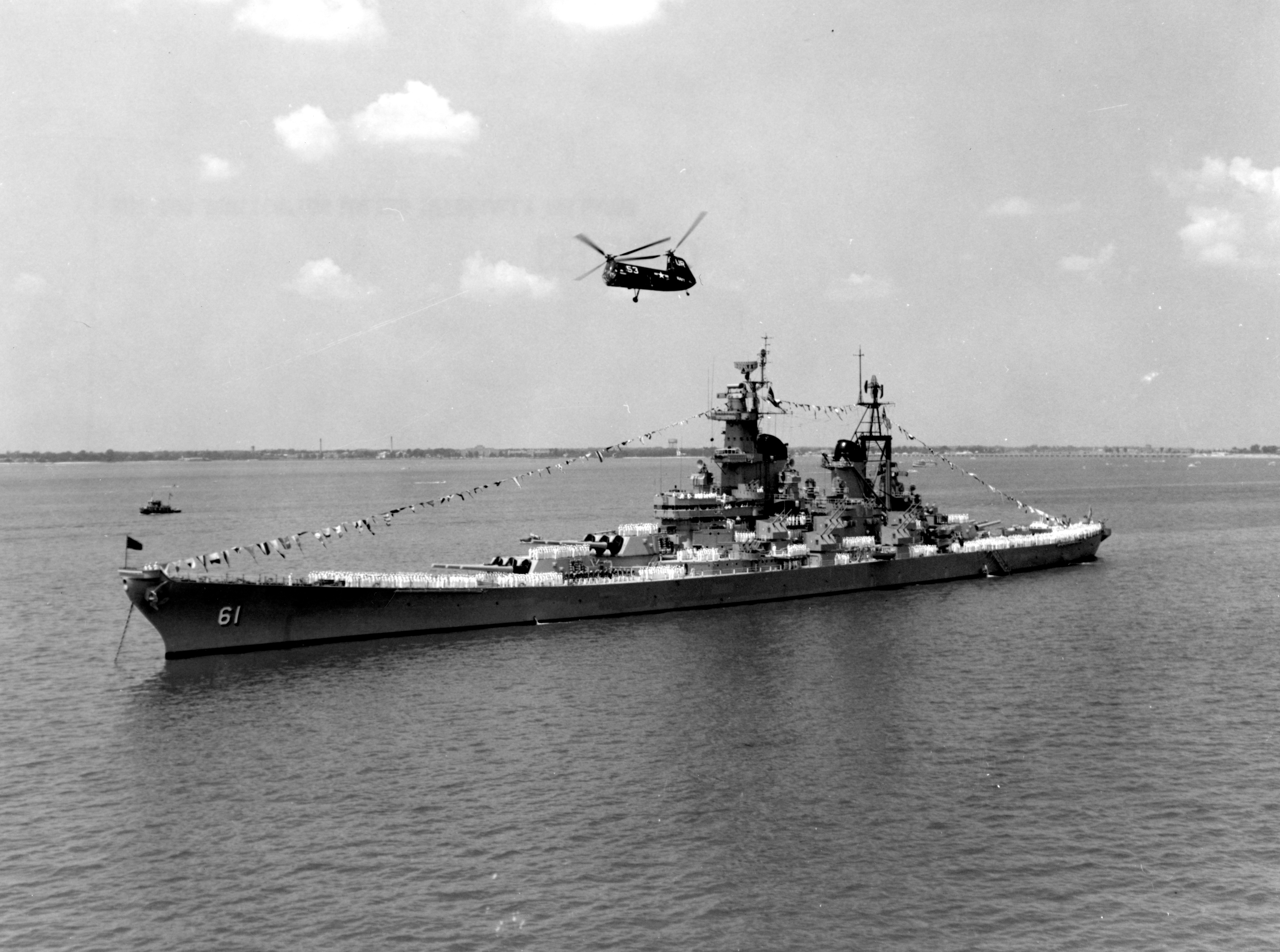
USS Iowa

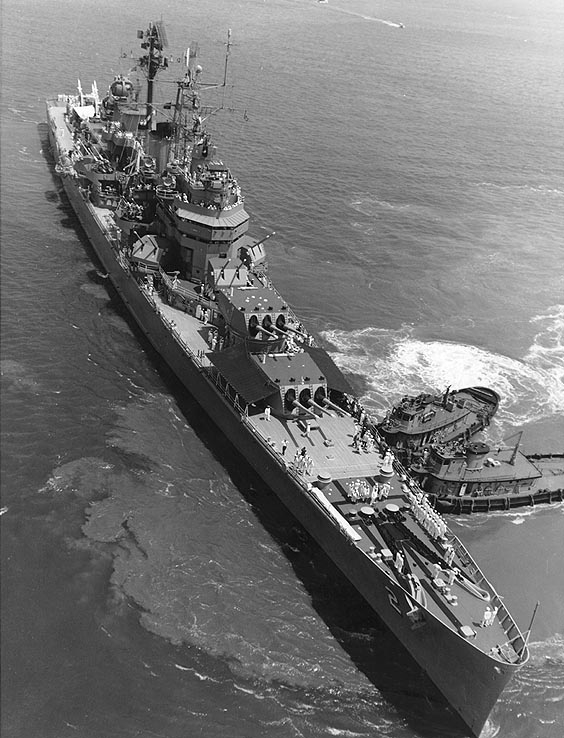
USS Canberra

26 June 1959, USS Lake St. Louis reviewed by the President and by Queen Elizabeth II, which included USS Forrest Royal and USS Forrest Sherman

=== Gerald Ford ===
1976 - New York Harbor – Fourth International Naval Review in honor of the United States Bicentennial. Set to coincide with Op Sail 1976, which included USS Forrestal as host ship on whose flight deck on 4 July the President rang in the Bicentennial.

American ships were joined with vessels from the United Kingdom, Canada, Australia, France, Italy, West Germany, Denmark, Norway, Sweden, Spain, Portugal, the Soviet Union, Israel, Egypt, Venezuela, Peru, Argentina, Chile, Colombia, South Africa, The Netherlands, & Romania.

"On 3 July, 23 US Naval vessels, and 30 foreign naval vessels began a ship parade from the Verranzano-Narrows Bridge into NY Harbor. This fourth International Naval Review included the first visit in 10 years of a US aircraft carrier to NY."

— Stewart B Milstein, NY Fleet Reviews

US Ships Participating in the 1976 Naval Review
USS Wainwright - Flagship; USS Austin; USS Dale; USS Edenton; USS Farragut; USCGC Firebush; USS Forrestal; USS Fort Snelling; USS Harlan County; USS Hoist	USS Julius A Furer; USS Kalamazoo; USS La Moure County; USCGC Mahoning; USCGC Manitou; USCGC Morgenthau; USS Mount Whitney; USS Nashville; USS Papago	USS Pharris; USCGC Red Beech; USS Richard L. Page; USS Richmond K. Turner; USS San Diego; USCGC Sauk; USS Savannah; USS Spartanburg County; USS William V. Pratt

Foreign Ships Participating in the 1976 Naval Review
HMAS Hobart (Australia); D-35 Sergipe (Brazil); HMCS Iroquois (Canada); HDMS Peder Skram (Denmark); DOMR Separación (Dom. Rep.); ENS El Horreya (Egypt); FS Drogou (France); FS Duperré (France); HMS London (UK); HMS Bacchante (UK)	HMS Lowestoft (UK); INS Tarashish (Israel); INS Yaffo (Israel); ITS San Giorgio (Italy); JDS Katori (Japan); JDS Nagatsuki (Japan); HNLMS Holland (Netherlands); HNLMS Tromp (Netherlands); HNLMS Zeeland (Netherlands); HNoMS Trondheim (Norway)	BAP Independencia (Peru); NRP Alfonso Cerqeria (Portugal); NRP Honório Barreto (Portugal); SAS President Kruger (South Africa); ESPS Asturias (Spain); HSwMS Älvsnabben (Sweden); TCG Peyk (Turkey); ARV Zulia (Venezuela); FGS Glücksburg (West Germany); FGS Hessen (West Germany)

"On 4 July, naval vessels representing 21 foreign nations and the United States will form an anchor line of review for more than 225 sailing ships marching up the Hudson in the Operation Sail 1976 parade. Leading the parade will be 16 magnificent anachronisms, tall ships with masts reaching so high that they could not navigate the 127-foot clearance of the lattice worked Brooklyn Bridge."

— Jim O'Doherty, Operation Sail 1976

Participating Tall Ships in order of Review
USCGC Eagle (United States); Danmark (Denmark); Christian Radich (Norway); ARA Libertad (Argentina); BACH Esmeralda (Chile); ARC Gloria (Colombia)	FGS Gorch Fock (Germany); ITS Amerigo Vespucci (Italy); JS Nippon Maru (Japan); Dar Pomorza (Poland); NRP Sagres (Portugal); ESPS Juan Sebastián de Elcano (Spain)	ROS Mircea (Romania); USSRS Tovarishch (Soviet Union); Kruzenshtern (Soviet Union); Gazela Primeiro (United States)

=== Ronald Reagan ===
1986 - On July 3–4, the Fifth International Naval Review commemorating the rededication of the Statue of Liberty was held in New York Harbor. Repeating the model from 1776, the warships came in on July 3 and anchored along the channel and the Tall Ships sailed up the Hudson River to the George Washington Bridge past USS John F. Kennedy, where Reagan and other VIPs gathered to review the fleet.

US Navy Ships Participating in the 1986 Naval Review
USS Bonefish; USS Boulder; USS Dahlgren; USS Emory S. Land	USS Iowa; USS Mount Whitney; USS Nashville; USS Platte	USNS Range Sentinel; USS Scott; USS Yorktown

USCG & NOAA Ships Participating in the 1986 Naval Review
USCGC Bollard; USCGC Cape Horn; USCGC Dallas; USCGC Evergreen; USCGC Gallatin; USCGC Hawser; USCGC Line	USCGC Penobscot Bay; USCGC Point Bataan; USCGC Point Francis; USCGC Point Franklin; USCGC Point Herron; USCGC Point Knoll; USCGC Raritan	USCGC Red Beech; USCGC Red Wood; NOAAS Researcher; USCGC Sorrel; USCGC Vigorous; USCGC Wire

Foreign Ships Participating in the 1986 Naval Review
F-44 Independência (Brazil); HMCS Iroquois (Canada); FS Jeanne d'Arc (France); FS Jeanne De Vienne (France); FS Tourville (France); HMS Ark Royal (UK); HMS Cleopatra (UK)	HMS Sirius (UK); FNH Copan (Honduras); FNH Tegucigalpa (Honduras); INS Godavari (India); LÉ Eithne (Ireland); HMJS Paul Bogle (Jamaica); JDS Katori (Japan)	JDS Nagatsuki (Japan); HNLMS Abraham Crijnssen (Netherlands); HNoMS Horten (Norway); FGS Braunschweig(West Germany); FGS Deutschland(West Germany); FGS Offenburg (West Germany)

Tall Ship Participants in the 1986 Parade of Ships
USCGC Eagle (USA); Ernestina (United States); Danmark (Denmark); Christian Radich (Norway); ARA Libertad (Argentina); Zenobe Gramme (Belgium); Bluenose II (Canada); Esmeralda (Chile); ARC Gloria (Colombia)	BAE Guayas (Ecuador); Belem (France); Dewaruci (Indonesia); Galaxy (Israel); ITS Amerigo Vespucci (Italy); ARM Cuauhtémoc (Mexico); Sørlandet (Norway); Shabab Oman (Oman); NRP Sagres (Portugal)	ESPS Juan Sebastián de Elcano (Spain); Svanen of Stockholm (Sweden); Calida (Scotland); Capitan Miranda (Uruguay); Simon Bolivar (Venezuela); Elissa (United States); Gazela of Philadelphia (United States) Roseway (United States)

=== Bill Clinton ===
3–9 July 2000, New York City – Sixth International Naval Review, set to coincide with Op Sail 200, included the following U.S naval vessels:

Reviewing Ships

- USS Hue City (Clinton's flagship)
- USS John F. Kennedy
- USS Nassau
- USS McFaul
- USS Elrod
- USS Mount Whitney
- USS John Hancock
- USS Underwood
- USS Jacksonville
- USNS Fisher
- USCGC Dallas
- USCGC Harriet Lane
- NOAAS Rude
- FS De Grasse (France)
- JS Yūgiri (Japan)
- JS Kashima (Japan)
- HMCS Montreal (Canada)
- HMCS Ville de Quebec (Canada)
- HS Aris (Greece)
- INS Mysore (India)
- LE Eithne (Ireland)
- ITS Luigi Durand de la Penne (Italy)
- RSS Endurance (Singapore)
- SAS Drakensberg (South Africa)
- TCG Fatih (Turkey)
- UNS Slavutych (Ukraine)
- HMS Manchester (United Kingdom)
- RMS Queen Elizabeth 2 (United Kingdom)

Parading Vessels

Participants in the 2000 Parade of Ships
Eagle (USA); Amerigo Vespucci (ship) (Italy); Danmark (Denmark); Spirit of Massachusetts (USA); Harvey Gamage (USA); Esmeralda (Chile); Libertad (Argentina); Capitan Miranda (Uruguay); Guayas (Ecuador)	Bak'tivshchyna (Ukraine); Gloria (Colombia); Dar Młodzieży (Poland); Gorch Fock (Germany); Edna E. Lockwood (United States); Clipper City (United States); Californian (United States); Ernestina (United States); Pride of Baltimore II (United States)	HMS Rose (United States); Maryland Dove (United States); Niagara (United States); Simon Bolivar (Venezuela); Oosterschelde (Netherlands); Bowdoin (United States); Cisne Branco (Brazil); Søren Larsen (New Zealand); Dewaruci (Indonesia)

=== Donald Trump ===
In honor of the United States Semiquincentennial, the United States Navy will host a naval review on 4 July 2026 in New York Harbor. It is planned for more than 80 ships from 30 countries to be taking part. It will also coincide with OpSail 2026.

Reviewing vessels

Naval Vessels in the International Naval Review
USS Nimitz; USS Kearsarge; USS Arlington; USS Farragut; USS Nitze; TS Empire State VII; TS State of Maine V TV King's Pointer; USCGC Stone; USCGC Forward; USCGC William Chadwick; USCGC Bonito; USCGC Wire	ESPS Juan Carlos I (Spain); ESPS Castilla (Spain); ESPS Blas de Lezo (Spain); ESPS Reina Sofía (Spain); ESPS Patiño (Spain)	HNLMS Van Amstel (The Netherlands); HNLMS Den Helder (The Netherlands); HMCS St. John's (Canada); HDMS Iver Huitfeldt (Denmark); HNoMS Fridtjof Nansen (Norway); NoCGV Hopen (Norway); FGS Sachsen (Germany)	BNS Leopold I (Belgium); BNS Independência (Brazil); ROKS Munmu the Great (South Korea); ARM Papaloapan (Mexico); TCG Oruçreis (Turkey)	BAP Tacna (Peru); RMNS Mohammed VI (Morocco); JS Yamagiri (Japan); JS Kashima (Japan); SNS Niani (Senegal); RMS Queen Mary 2 (United Kingdom)

Parading Vessels

Tallship Participants in the 2026 Parade of Ships
RV Robert Gray (USA) - parade escort ship Eagle (USA); Amerigo Vespucci (ship) (Italy); Esmeralda (Chile); Libertad (Argentina); Capitan Miranda (Uruguay)	Guayas (Ecuador); Gloria (Colombia); Dar Młodzieży (Poland); Gorch Fock (Germany); Sagres (Portugal)	Mircea (Romania); Juan Bautista Cambiaso (Dominican Republic); Belle Poule (France)	Sudarshini (India); Tuiga (Monaco); Oosterschelde (The Netherlands); Unión (Peru); Juan Sebastián de Elcano (Spain)	Gladan (Sweden); Vela (British Virgin Islands); Angelique (USA); Elissa (USA); Effie M. Morrissey (USA)	Harvey Gamage (USA); When and If (USA); American Eagle (USA)

== RIMPAC ==
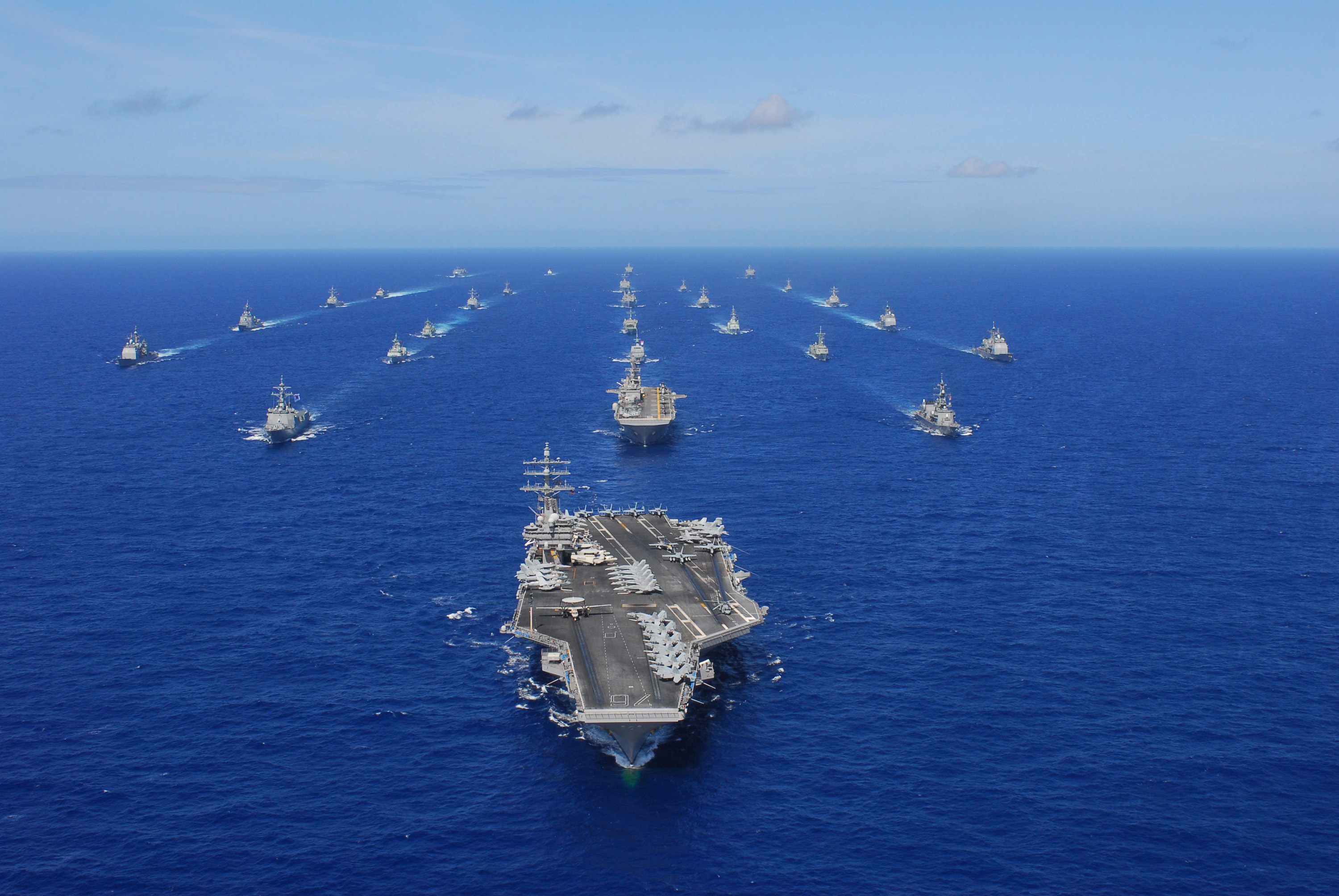
USS Ronald Reagan (CVN 76) leads the RIMPAC 2010 fleet

First held in 1971, RIMPAC is the world's largest international maritime warfare exercise. Hosted and administered by the United States Navy's Indo-Pacific Command in conjunction with the Marine Corps, the Coast Guard, and Hawaii National Guard. It is described by the US Navy as a unique training opportunity that helps participants foster and sustain the cooperative relationships that are critical to ensuring the safety of sea lanes and security on the world's oceans.

Although the 2020 RIMPAC exercise was curtailed due to the COVID-19 pandemic, 25,000 naval personnel and 52 ships and submarines from 26 countries participated in the 2018 exercises, with forces representing Australia, Brazil, Brunei, Canada, Chile, Colombia, France, Germany, India, Indonesia, Israel, Japan, Malaysia, Mexico, Netherlands, New Zealand, Peru, the Republic of Korea, the Republic of the Philippines, Singapore, Sri Lanka, Thailand, Tonga, the United Kingdom, the United States, and Vietnam.

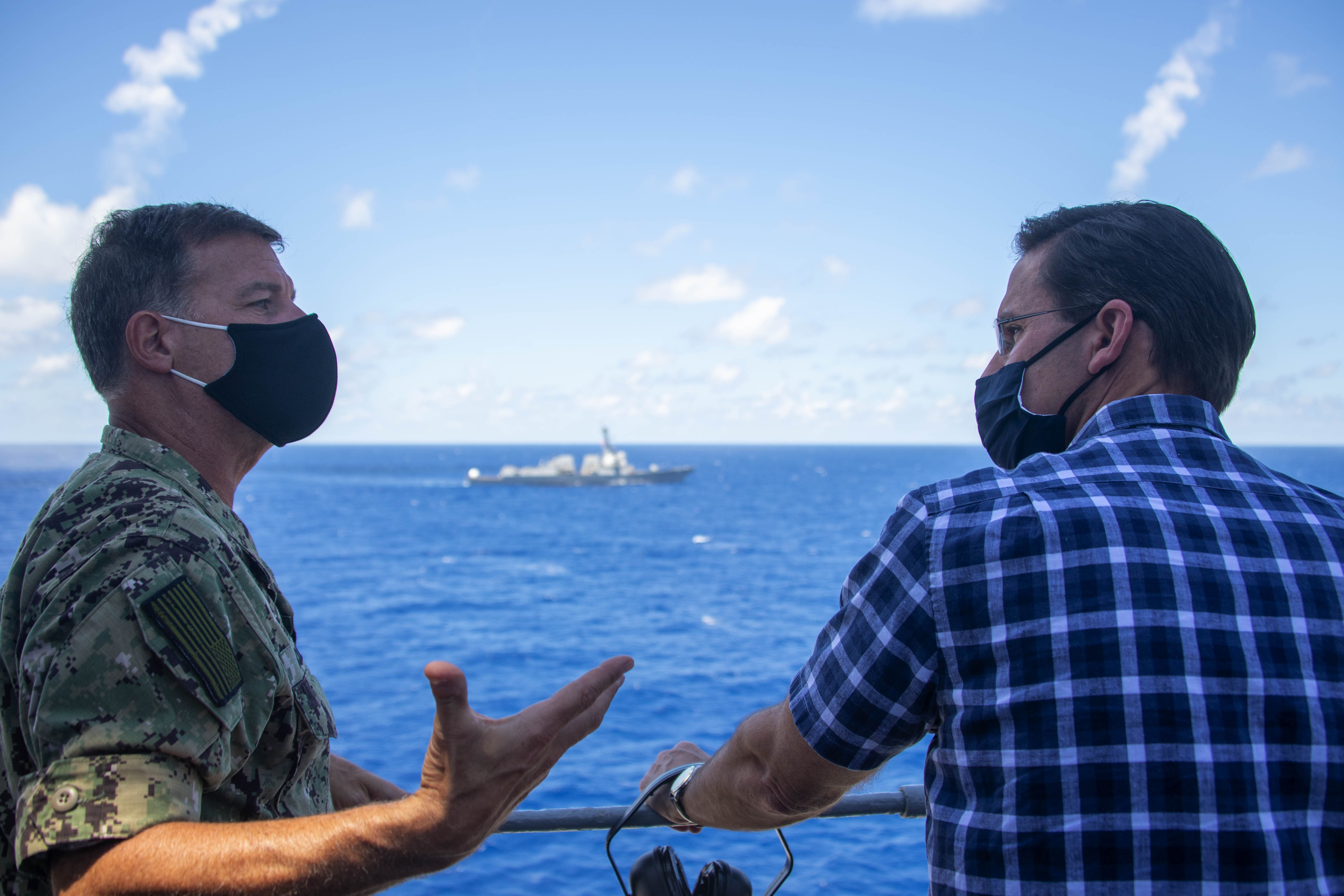
SecDef Esper with CINCPACFLT Aquilino at RIMPAC 2020

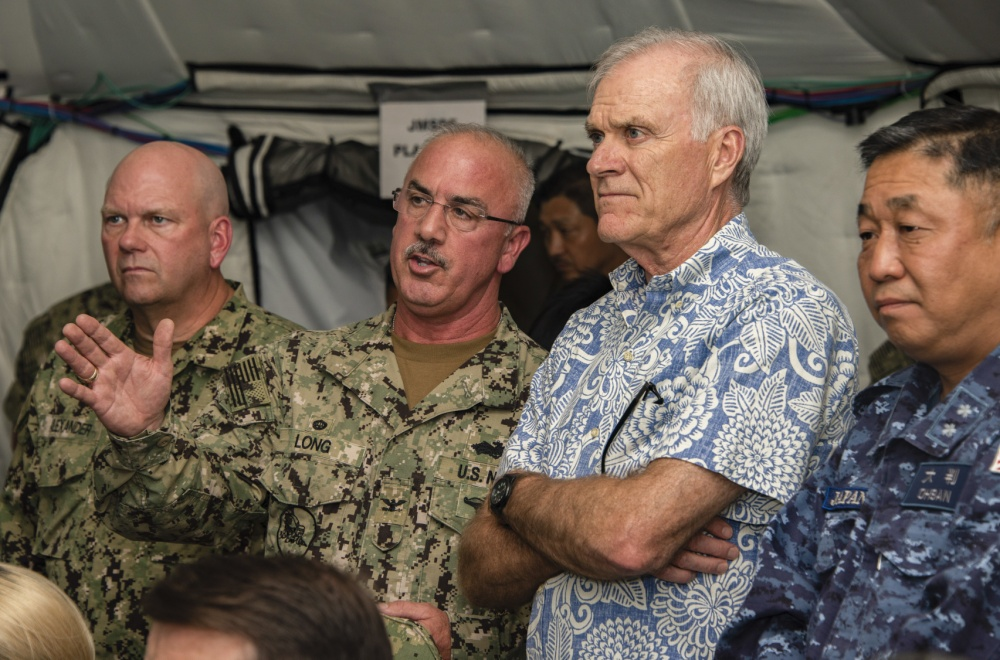
SECNAV Richard Spencer meets with RIMPAC 2018 commanders

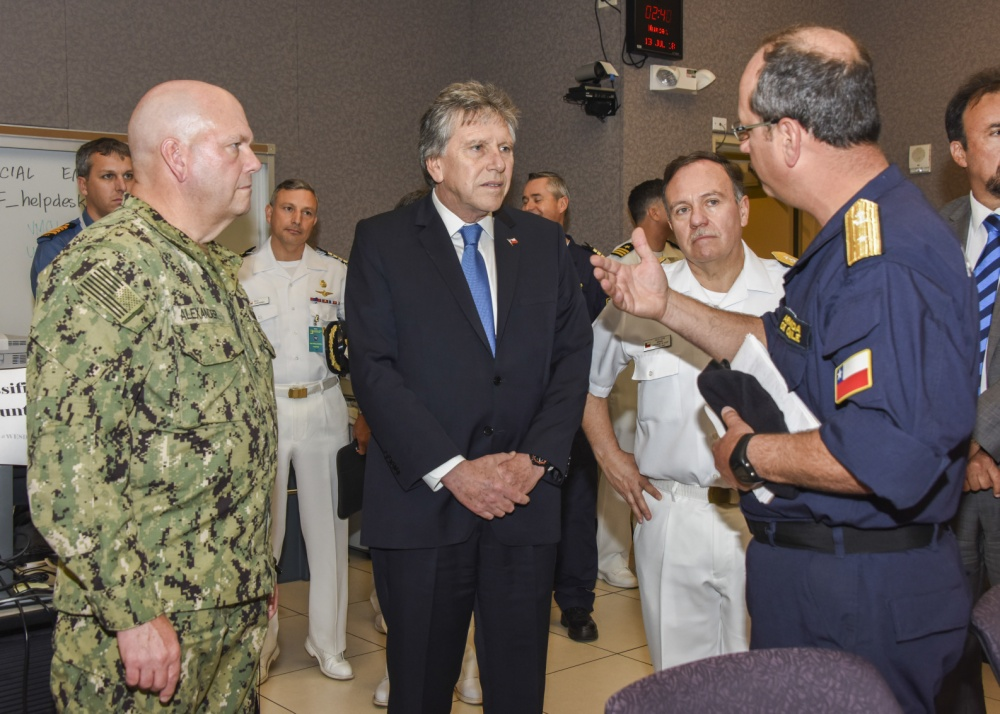
Chilean defense minister Alberto Espina participates in RIMPAC 2018

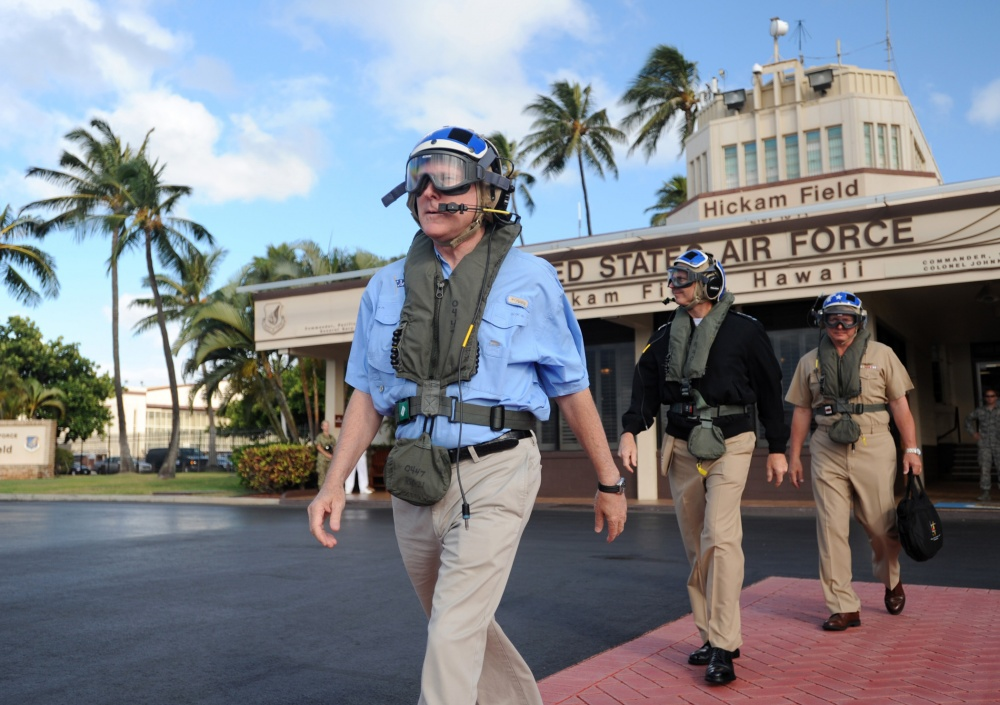
SECNAV Mabus departs Hickam to review the RIMPAC 2012 fleet
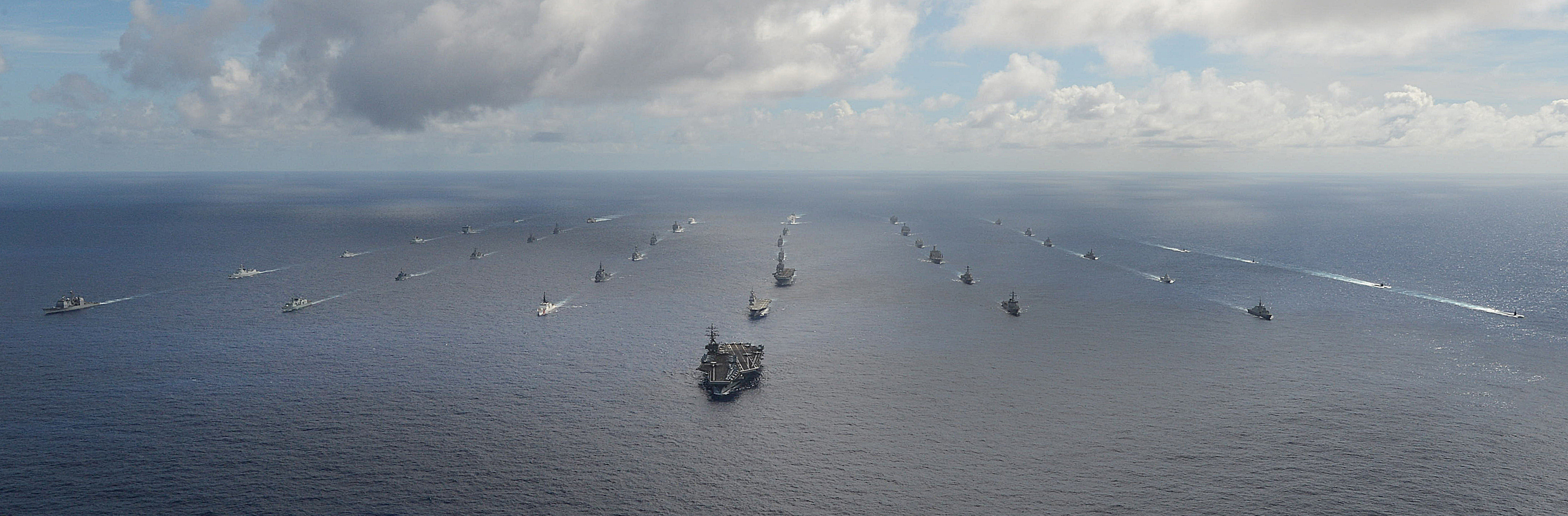
42 ships & subs from 15 nations in close formation during RIMPAC 2014
