= Operation Sail =

Series of US celebratory sailing events

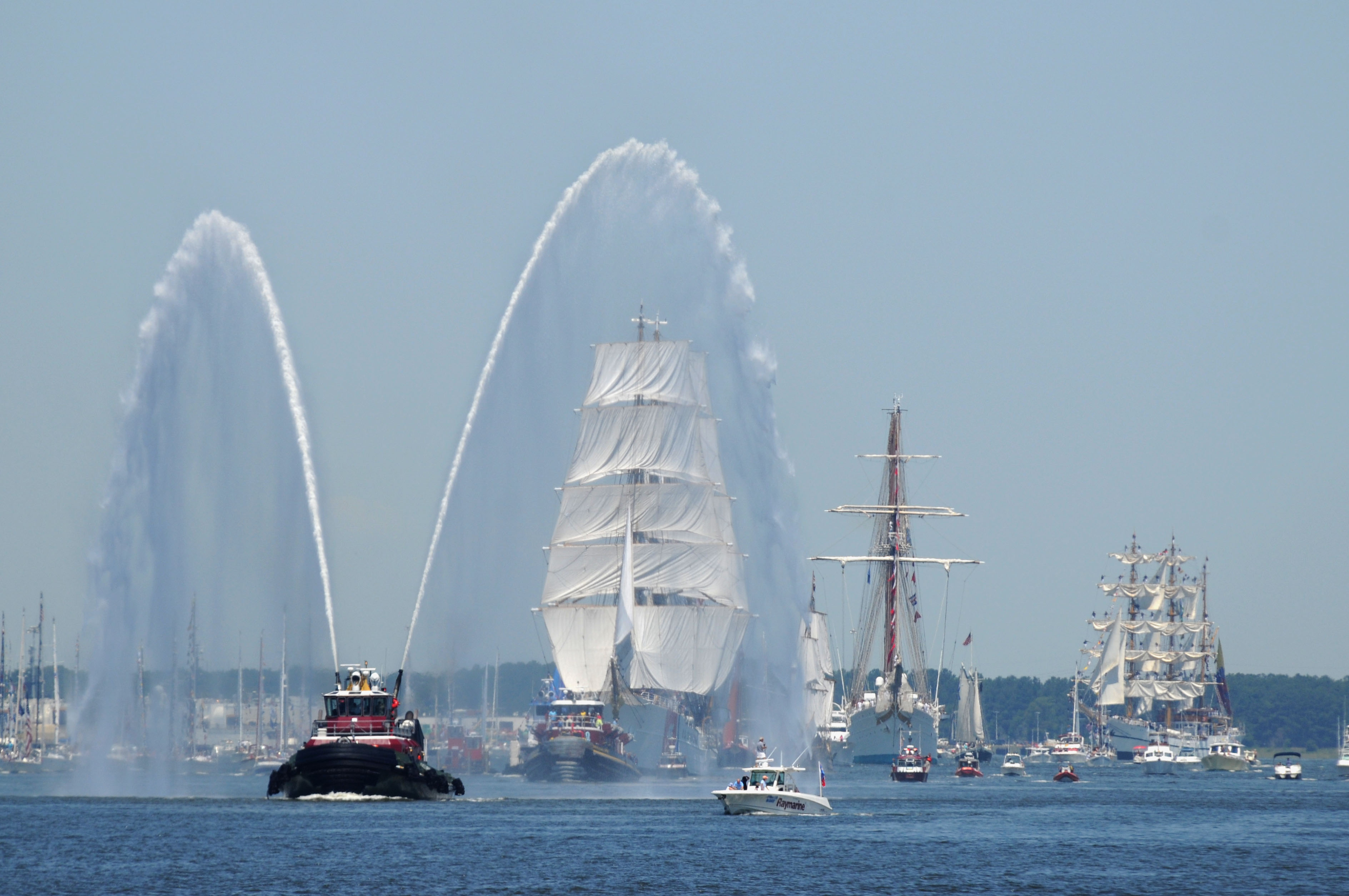
OpSail 2012 in Virginia

Operation Sail refers to a series of sailing events held to celebrate special occasions and features sailing vessels from around the world. Each event is coordinated by Operation Sail, Inc., a non-profit organization established in 1961 by U.S. president John F. Kennedy, and must be approved by the United States Congress. Often referred to as OpSail or Op Sail, the event has the goals of promoting good will and cooperation between countries while providing sail training and celebrating maritime history. It is also sometimes erroneously referred to as "Tall Ships". While the tall ships form the centerpiece of the event, smaller sailing vessels also participate.

Op Sail events, when scheduled, are run concurrently with the annual International Naval Review, which features present-day warships from various navies. Six Op Sail events have been held to date, in 1964, 1976, 1986, 1992, 2000 and 2012. The event culminates in the Parade of Ships on the Hudson River and in New York Harbor on July 4, Independence Day. The United States Coast Guard cutter Eagle has been the host vessel to all six Op Sail events.

Along with Nils Hansell, Frank Braynard launched the world's first Operation Sail, an extravaganza in which tall ships and naval vessels filled New York Harbor, in 1964.

== World's Fair Parade of Ships (1964) ==
The inaugural Opsail was a tie-in with the 1964 New York World's Fair. Operation Sail 1964: Four years in the making, Operation Sail is an international effort to promote goodwill and to generate awareness of ships and shipping. It is a dream come true for sailing enthusiasts, and a once-in-a-lifetime opportunity for anyone who is stirred by the sight of a square rigger under full sail.

Many nations maintain sailing ships in this machine age because they believe there is no better way to build character in young men than sail training. It encourages initiative, steadfastness, leadership and personal courage .... the records of the brotherhood of the sea sparkle with innumerable examples of the value of such training. The prestige of having served aboard a windjammer is no small matter.

To reach New York for the July 14 parade up the Hudson River, some of these tall ships will have sailed from their home ports as long ago as early March. Some will have raced from Plymouth, England, to Lisbon, Portugal, then 3000 miles across the Atlantic to Bermuda rendezvous, and a 630-mile northwest run, in company, to New York.

These ships are specifically built for training under sail. As these ships plough the oceans, the men who man this fleet help to forge a bond of understanding and mutual respect around the world.

As you visit the ships and talk with their officers, crews, and trainees, consider the thirteen participating nations, the thousands of people involved in such a gathering, the many man hours spent in preparations which have resulted in this great spectacle OPERATION SAIL.

- July 12: Ships anchor in designated order in Gravesend Bay.
- July 13: 1430- Captains briefing aboard USCG 1730-2000: Reception at Chase Manhattan Bank.
- July 14: 1100- Ships will depart Gravesend Bay and pass official reviewing vessel, USS Randolph, and then proceed to anchorages below the George Washington Bridge.
- July 15: Ships move to assigned piers. 1400- Lifeboat races at U.S. Merchant Marine Academy, Kings Point. 1800- Commandant USCG reception.
- July 16: 1200- Ticker tape parade from Battery Park to City Hall. 1400-1800- Ships open to Public.2000-0100- Grand Ball, Holland America Line Pier 40, and seamen's Church Institute.
- July 17: 0900- Captains Symposium, Maritime Exchange. 1000-1800- Ships open to public. 1215- American Institute of Marine Underwriter's luncheon for Captains at India House.
- July 18: World's Fair Day, Singer Bowl. Public invited. 1000-1800 Ships open to Public.
- July 19: Divine Services Ships Depart.

(Taken from Operation Sail guide book 1964.)

=== Participation in 1964 Op Sail ===
The participants scheduled to take part in the 1964 Operation Sail event included:

- Argentina, Libertad (Note: Windjammers' Parade)
- Canada, Bluenose II
- Canada, St. Lawrence II
- Chile, Esmeralda
- Denmark, Danmark
- Dominican Republic, Patria
- Germany, Gorch Fock
- Germany, Peter von Danzig
- Indonesia, Dewarutji
- Italy, Corsaro II
- Norway, Christian Radich
- Norway, Sørlandet
- Norway, Statsraad Lehmkuhl
- Panama, Wandia
- Poland, Iskra
- Portugal, Sagres
- Spain, Juan Sebastián de Elcano
- Sweden, Albatross
- United Kingdom, Merlin
- United Kingdom, Tawau
- United States, Eagle (Note: Lead ship of the Windjammers' Parade)

== Bicentennial Program (1976) ==
Celebration of the United States Bicentennial, the 200th anniversary of the adoption of the United States Declaration of Independence. Of the relatively few tall ships that were in service around the world at the time, 16 sailed to New York to participate in the Grand Parade of Sailing Ships. Each of the ships flew a banner featuring the tricolor star insignia of the Bicentennial. They are referred to in the official program book as the square-rigged school ships. In addition, there were 113 supporting vessels of the Op Sail Fleet listed in the program book.

Tall Ships Participating in the 1976 Grand Parade of Sailing Ships
Amerigo Vespucci (Italy); Christian Radich (Norway); Danmark (Denmark); Dar Pomorza (Poland); Eagle (United States); Esmeralda (Chile)	Gazela Primeiro (United States); Gloria (Colombia); Gorch Fock (Germany); Juan Sebastián de Elcano (Spain); Kruzenshtern (Soviet Union)	Libertad (Argentina); Mircea (Romania); Nippon Maru (Japan); Sagres (Portugal); Tovarishch (Soviet Union)

Op Sail Fleet (as of May 1976)
America; Amistad; Artemis; Astral; Barba Negra; Barbara; Bel Espoir II; Bill of Rights; Black Pearl; Bluenose II; Brilliant; Cameo of Looe; Caper; Carillon of Wight; Carola; Challenger; Charm III; Charis; Chief Aptakisic; Clearwater; Club Mediterranee; Cotton Blossom IV; Creidne; Dar Szczecina; Ebbie; Eendracht; Enchantress; Erawan; Erg; Erika; Eye of the Wind; Fly; Freedom; Galleon's Lap; Germania VI; Gypsy Moth V Gladan; Glenan	Great Britain II; Hareida; Harvey Gamage; Henri; Hetman; Hudson Belle; Jacomina; Jade Dragon; Jolly Roger; Konstanty Maciejewicz; Kukri; Lindo; Lena Rose; Leonid Teliga; Magic venture Maruffa; Mary E Master Builder; Meka II; Meteor; Mitralis; Mon Lei; Nis-Puk; Norseman; Omaha; Outlaw; Pathfinder; Phoenix; Pioneer; Playfair; Polonez; Polski Len; Providence; Rachel and Ebenezer; Rattlesnake; Regina Maris; Rose; Roseway	Sabre; St. Lawrence II; St. Margaret II; Santa Maria; Saracen; Sayula II; Selina II; Sir Winston Churchill; Sherman Zwicker; Skookum II; Spirit of America; Spirit of '76; Stella Polare; Stoertebecker; Tappan Zee; Tenerife; Te Vega; The Empress; Transition; Ticonderoga; Tiki; Tina; Topaz; Unicorn; Urania; Vega; Veleda; Voyager; Walross III; Westward; White Dolphin III; William H. Albury; Wojewoda Koszalinski; Yellow Jacket; Zawisza Czarny; Zenobe Gramme; Zew Morza

== Salute to the Statue of Liberty (1986) ==
Celebrating the Statue of Liberty centennial

Participants in the 1986 Parade of Ships
Eagle (USA); Ernestina (United States); Danmark (Denmark); Christian Radich (Norway); Libertad (Argentina); Zenobe Gramme (Belgium); Bluenose II (Canada); Esmeralda (Chile); Gloria (Colombia)	Guayas (Ecuador); Belem (France); Dewaruci (Indonesia); Galaxy (Israel); Amerigo Vespucci (Italy); Cuauhtémoc (Mexico); Sørlandet (Norway); Shabab Oman (Oman)	Sagres (Portugal); Juan Sebastián de Elcano (Spain); Svanen of Stockholm (Sweden); Calida (Scotland); Capitan Miranda (Uruguay); Simon Bolivar (Venezuela); Elissa (United States); Gazela of Philadelphia (United States) Roseway (United States)

== Columbus Quincentennial (1992) ==
Celebrating the 500th anniversary of Christopher Columbus' landing in America. Winner of the tall ships class was the Norwegian full-rigger Christian Radich. The fleet of thirty-four sailing vessels was led by the U.S. Coast Guard Barque Eagle, and included ships from Denmark, Argentina, Australia, Belgium, Bulgaria, England, Canada, Chile, Colombia, Germany, Italy, Israel, Japan, Norway, Oman, Panama, Poland, Portugal, Russia, Spain, Poland, Uruguay, and Venezuela. [author John Richard, Executive Director of Operation Sail 1992]

== Summer Millennium Celebration (2000) ==
This ran from May 25 through July 31 with the traditional Parade of Ships in New York on July 4. Ports of call included San Juan, Puerto Rico; Miami, Florida; Norfolk, Virginia; Baltimore, Maryland; Philadelphia, Pennsylvania; New York City; New London, Connecticut; and Portland, Maine.

Participants in the 2000 Parade of Ships
Eagle (USA); Amerigo Vespucci (ship) (Italy); Danmark (Denmark); Spirit of Massachusetts (USA); Harvey Gamage (USA); Esmeralda (Chile); Libertad (Argentina); Capitan Miranda (Uruguay); Guayas (Ecuador)	Bak'tivshchyna (Ukraine); Gloria (Colombia); Dar Młodzieży (Poland); Gorch Fock (Germany); Edna E. Lockwood (United States); Clipper City (United States); Californian (United States); Ernestina (United States); Pride of Baltimore II (United States)	HMS Rose (United States); Maryland Dove (United States); Niagara (United States); Simon Bolivar (Venezuela); Oosterschelde (Netherlands); Bowdoin (United States); Cisne Branco (Brazil); Søren Larsen (New Zealand); Dewaruci (Indonesia)

== War of 1812 and "The Star-Spangled Banner" Bicentennial (2012) ==
During the summer of 2012, Operation Sail commemorated the bicentennial of both the War of 1812 and the writing of "The Star-Spangled Banner", with ports of call in New Orleans, Louisiana; New York City, New York; Norfolk, Virginia; Baltimore, Maryland; Boston, Massachusetts; New London, Connecticut; Milwaukee, Wisconsin; Chicago, Illinois; Toledo, Ohio; Cleveland, Ohio; Detroit, Michigan; and Buffalo, New York. Tall ships representing nine nations, as well as many independently owned tall ships, participated in parades of sail in these ports, and were open for general public visiting at no cost.

Participants in the 2012 Parade of Ships
Eagle (United States); Belle Poule (France); Cisne Branco (Brazil); Cuauhtémoc (Mexico); Dewaruci (Indonesia)	Étoile (France); Gloria (Colombia); Guayas (Ecuador); Juan Sebastián de Elcano (Spain)

== United States Semiquincentennial (2026) ==
In celebration of the 250th anniversary of the United States Declaration of Independence in 2026, Sail250, the largest gathering of Tall ships since 1976, made port calls in the following cities:

- New Orleans, Louisiana (May 28-June 1)
- Norfolk, Virginia (June 19-24)
- Baltimore, Maryland (June 25-July 1)
- New York City, New York^{iv} (July 4-8)
- Boston, Massachusetts (July 11-16)

Participating ships included:

- A. J. Meerwald (United States)
- Amerigo Vespucci (Italy)
- Belle Poule (France)
- Bluenose II (Canada)
- Capitán Miranda (Uruguay)
- USS Constellation (United States)
- USS Constitution (United States)
- Denis Sullivan (United States)
- Dar Młodzieży (Poland)
- USCGC Eagle^{f}^{s} (United States)
- Elissa (United States)
- Ernestina-Morrissey (United States)
- Esmeralda (Chile)
- Gazela (United States)
- Gladan (Sweden)
- ARC Gloria (Colombia)
- Godspeed (United States)
- Gorch Fock^{s} (Germany)
- BAE Guayas (Ecuador)
- Juan Bautista Cambiaso (Dominican Republic)
- Juan Sebastián de Elcano (Spain)
- Kalmar Nyckel (United States)
- ARA Libertad (Argentina)
- Liberty Clipper (United States)
- Lynx (United States)
- Mircea^{s} (Romania)
- Oosterschelde (Netherlands)
- Picton Castle (Cook Islands)
- Pioneer (United States)
- Pride of Baltimore II (United States)
- NRP Sagres^{s} (Portugal)
- Spirit of Bermuda (Bermuda)
- INS Sudarshini (India)
- BAP Unión (Peru)
- Virginia (United States)
- When and If (United States)

=== Notes ===
^{Sail 4th} - The 4th of July centerpiece event all visiting ships were expected to attend. The entire fleet may not have visited every port.
^{Flagship} - Eagle was designated as the fleet's flagship for the event(s).
^{Sisterships} - Eagle and her remaining Blohm & Voss sister ships, the first time they met since 1976.
