= Guayas =

Guayas may refer to:

- Guayas River, Ecuador
- Guayas Province, Ecuador
- BAE Guayas, ships of the Ecuadorian navy
- Guayas (chief), a legendary chief of the Huancavilcas in the coastal plains of modern Ecuador
- The fruit of the mamoncillo tree
