= Frank Braynard =

American author and maritime historian (1916–2007)

Francis Osborn Braynard (August 21, 1916 – December 10, 2007) was a prominent American author and maritime historian.

== Life ==
Born Francis Osborn Braynard in Glen Cove, New York, he earned an undergraduate degree in history from Duke University in 1939, and master's degree in maritime history from Columbia University.

Along with Nils Hansell, Braynard launched the world's first Operation Sail, an extravaganza in which tall ships and naval vessels filled New York harbor, in 1964. He was chief organizer for OpSail 76, marking the bicentennial of the United States of America.

Braynard was also one of the creators of South Street Seaport, a complex of shops and urban amenities built in several blocks of old waterfront buildings on the East River in New York City. He was also a curator at the American Merchant Marine Museum on the grounds of the U.S. Merchant Marine Academy in Kings Point, NY.

He died on December 10, 2007, at the age of 91 at his long-time residence on Dubois Avenue in Sea Cliff, New York.

== Author ==
Frank is the author of 34 books including the six-volume encyclopedic work on the ocean liner, SS Leviathan

- "Lives of the Liners", 1947.
- "Fifty Years on N.Y. Ship", 1949.
- "Famous American Ships"1956
- "The Story of Ships", 1962
- "S.S. Savannah", The Elegant Steamship, 1963
- "By Their Works Ye Shall Know Them", 1968
- "Leviathan, Vol I", 1972
- "Marine Collection of India House", 1973
- "Leviathan, Vol II"1974
- "Leviathan, Vol III", 1976
- "Leviathan, Vol IV, "1978
- "Great Liners", 1978 (co-author)
- "Famous American Ships", 1978 (revised edition)
- "Sail, Steam & Splendor", 1978 (co-author)
- "Romance of the Sea", 1980 (co-author)
- "Leviathan, Vol V"1981
- "Big Ship", 1981
- "Il Nastro Zaaurro", 1981 - in Italian
- "Famous Fifty Liners, Volume I" 1982, with Bill Miller
- "Leviathan, Vol VI", 1983
- "Famous Fifty Liners, Volume II", 1985, with Bill Miller
- "Picture History of the Normandie", 1987
- "Fifty Famous Liners, Vol III", 1987, with Bill Miller
- "SS Savannah", 1988, Revised Edition
- "Story of Titanic in Postcards", 1988
- "Salute to The Crown", 1988
- "Classic Ocean Liners, Vol I", 1990
- "Picture History of the Cunard Line", 1990, with Bill Miller
- "U.S. Steamships", 1991"
- "The Tall Ships of Today in Photographs", 1993, Dover Publications 0-486-27163-3
- "Classic Ocean Liners, Vol II", 1994

== Artist ==
Sketchbooks include

- "Ship Sketchbook", 1962 includes 12 sketches
- Tugman's Sketchbook", 1965
- "From Fire Island to Venice", 1966
- "One Square Mile: A Sea Cliff Sketchbook, 1967
- "1976 Operation Sale Portfolio"
- "Search for the Tall Ships"
- "American Troopships Past and Present"
- United States Passenger Ships Over the Years"
- "A Sketcher's Paradise"
- "Saltaire Sketches"
- "From Sea Cliff" to Barcelona: A Lifetime in Sketches", 1995, 1-879-180-11

== Maritime historian ==
- Assistant Marine Editor, New York Herald Tribune
