= BAE Guayas =

BAE Guayas may refer to one of the following ships of the Ecuadorian Navy:

- BAE Guayas (E-21), the former American Tacoma-class frigate USS Covington (PF-56); launched, July 1943; acquired by the Ecuadorian Navy, 1947; flagship of the Ecuadorian Navy, 1947–1967; decommissioned, 1972; stricken, 1974
- BAE Guayas (BE-21), a sail-training vessel of the Ecuadorian Navy; launched September 1976; in active service
