= Gazela =

Portuguese-built museum ship in Pennsylvania, US

Coordinates: 39.944012°N 75.141270°W

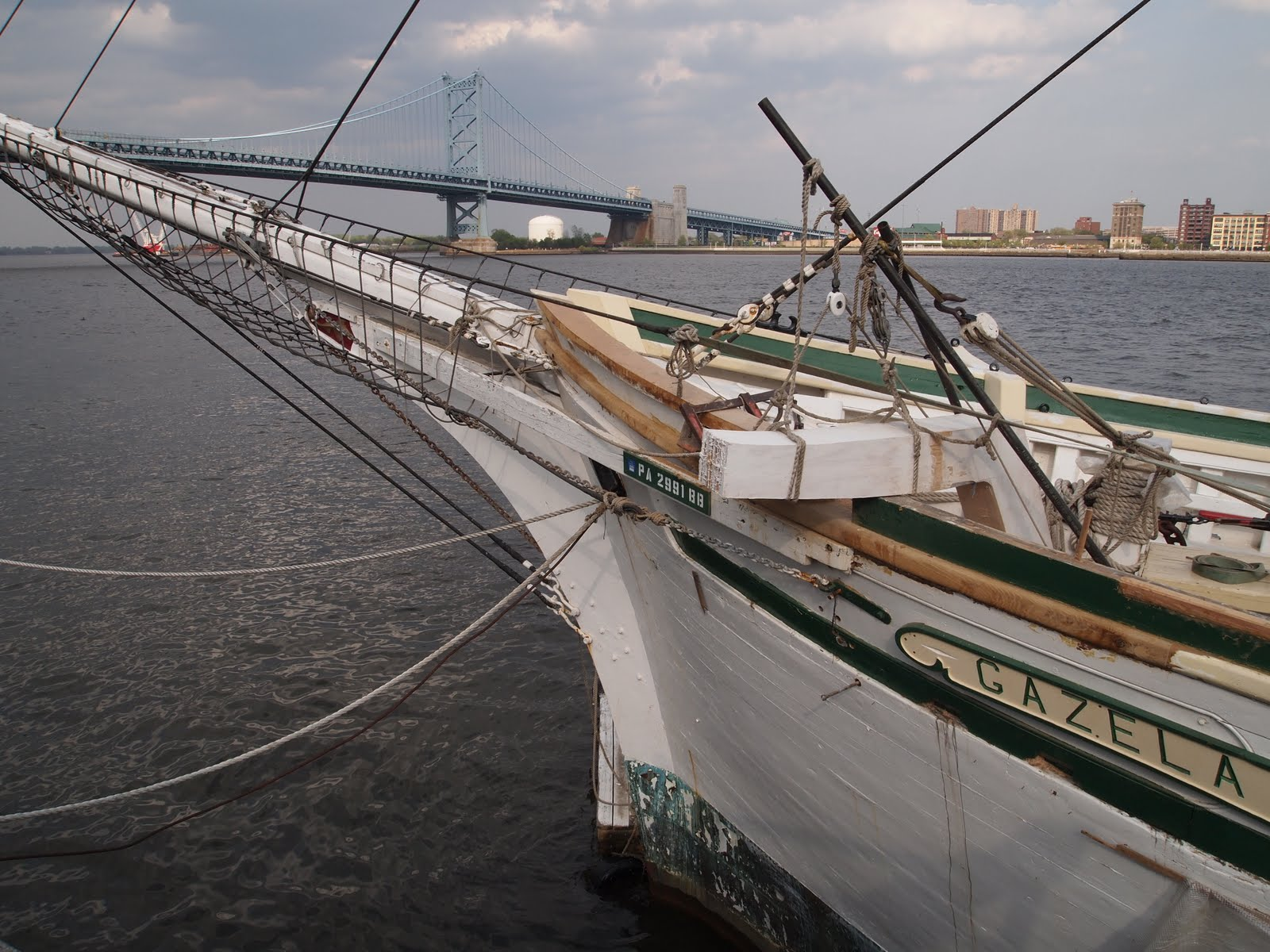
- Gazela docked in Philadelphia in April 2012

History

Portugal
- Name: Gazela
- Namesake: Gazelle (in Portuguese)
- Port of registry: Lisbon
- Builder: J. M. Mendes yards in Setúbal, Portugal
- Completed: 1901
- Out of service: Retired from fishing, 1969
- Fate: Sold and transferred to the Philadelphia Maritime Museum, 1971

United States
- Name: Gazela
- Owner: Philadelphia Ship Preservation Guild
- Acquired: 1971
- Identification: IMO number: 5126885
- Status: Museum Ship/Training ship

General characteristics
- Tonnage: 652 deadweight, 299 gross
- Length: 177 ft (54 m). overall, 140 ft (43 m). on deck, 133 ft (41 m). on the waterline
- Beam: 26 ft (7.9 m). at maximum beam
- Height: 94 ft (29 m). from the deck
- Draft: approx. 17 ft (5.2 m).
- Installed power: Diesel - CAT 3406 540 HP
- Sail plan: Barquentine 8,910 square feet (828 m^{2})
- Notes: wooden hull

Gazela is a wooden tall ship, built in 1901, whose home port is Philadelphia. She was built as a commercial fishing vessel, and used in that capacity for more than sixty years. She now serves as the maritime goodwill ambassador for the City of Philadelphia, the Commonwealth of Pennsylvania, and the Ports of Philadelphia and Camden, New Jersey. She has been featured in a number of films, and participated in domestic and international events, including OpSail 2000.

== History ==
The barquentine Gazela Primeiro (meaning Gazelle the First in Portuguese) was built in the shipyard of J. M. Mendes in Setúbal, Portugal in 1883. At that time the Portuguese fisheries authorities had a regulation prohibiting the construction of new vessels for the Grand Banks cod fishery. It was however permissible to modify or "rebuild" an existing vessel. The best information available indicates that the registration of a much smaller, two-masted vessel built in Cacilhas in 1883, named Gazella (spelled with two Ls), was transferred by the owners to the newly built vessel in 1901. There is no evidence that any timbers from the earlier vessel were re-used in the construction of the later one; a practice which would make no sense to a commercial wooden shipbuilder in the 1900s.

Gazela was built to carry fishermen to the Grand Banks of Newfoundland. Every spring she would leave Lisbon, laden with as many as 35 dories stacked on deck like drinking cups, a crew of 40 men (35 fishermen/sailors, two cooks, two mates and the captain), and a couple of apprentices. Her cargo hold would be full of salt as ballast. The salt would be used for the fish that were caught (cod, flounder, halibut, haddock and perch), preserving them for the long trip home. Gazela could stow upwards of 350 tons of salted fish in her holds.

Gazela was engine-less until 1938, when a Mannheim-Benz diesel engine was installed. With the depletion of cod on the Grand Banks, vessels were being forced to fish the Davis Strait, between Greenland and Baffin Island, Canada. The contrary winds and frequent icebergs in this area made life difficult for ships without engines. To accommodate the propeller, a new rudder post was installed and her counter was extended approximately 10–12 feet, giving her a long overhanging transom.

After a remarkably long commercial career, Gazela's last voyage to the Grand Banks of Newfoundland as a commercial fishing ship was made in 1969.

== Philadelphia ==
Gazela was purchased by philanthropist William Wikoff Smith for the Philadelphia Maritime Museum in 1971. The ship sailed for Philadelphia on May 24, 1971, with a crew of Americans (including one former Gazela engineer Manuel M. Rocha). She traced Columbus' route via the Canary Islands and San Juan, Puerto Rico and on Thursday, July 8, made her first entrance into Philadelphia.

In 1985, Gazela was transferred to the Philadelphia Ship Preservation Guild, the not-for-profit corporation that now maintains and operates the vessel with the help of donors and volunteers, sending her as Philadelphia's tall ship to events up and down the eastern seaboard of the U.S. Gazela spends the spring and summer months cruising the Delaware River and the Atlantic Coast. In the winter months Gazela is maintained by volunteer members of the Philadelphia Ship Preservation Guild.

== Gallery ==
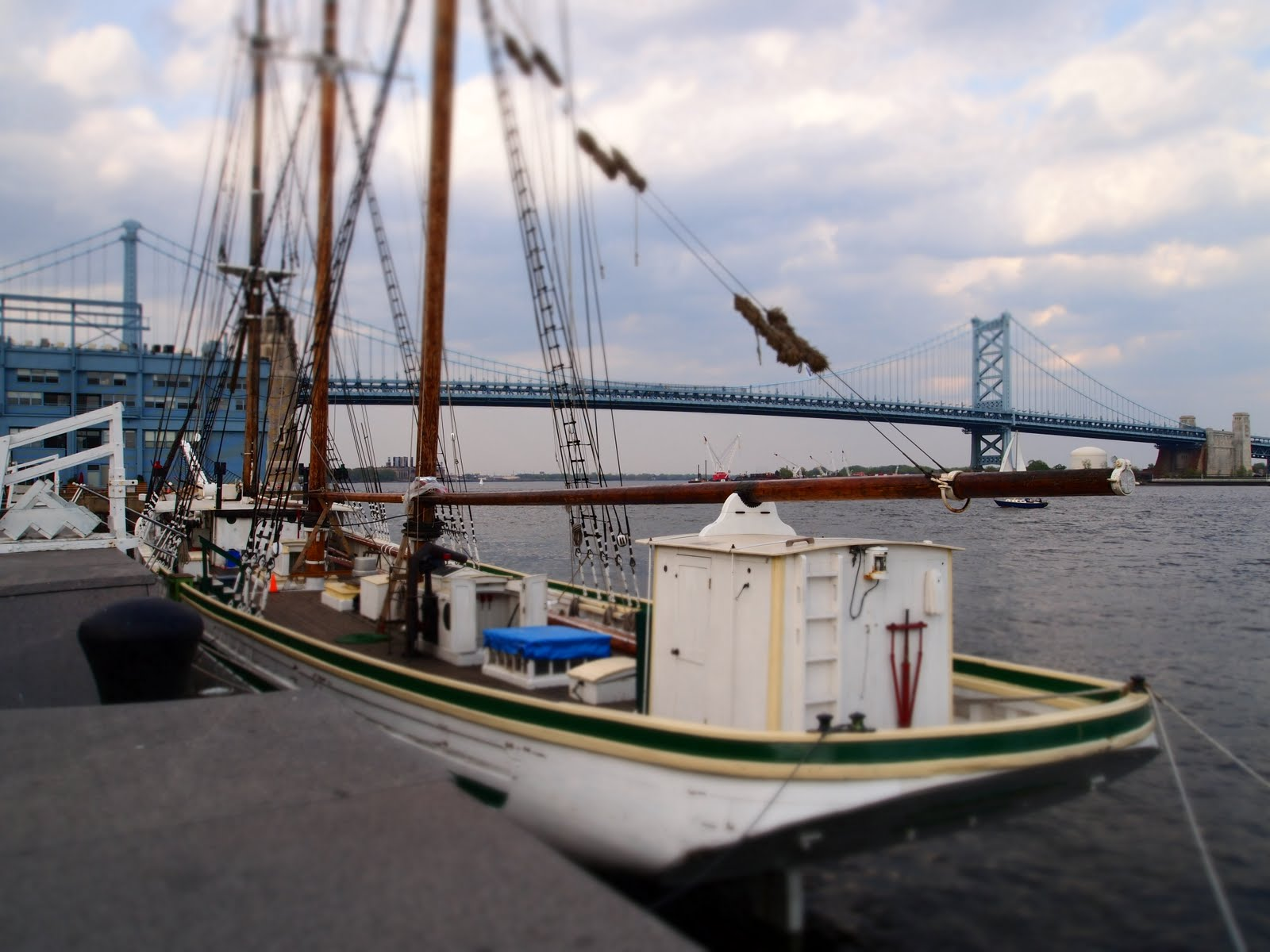
Diorama shot of Gazela docked at Penns Landing, Philadelphia, PA

A small wooden dory used for bringing fish back to the Gazela

== In print and film ==
- Civil War Gold, a National Geographic documentary chronicling the history of the SS Republic, a Civil War sidewheel steamship. 2003.
- The Widow of Saint-Pierre, a French film nominated for a Golden Globe. 2000.
- The Irish In America, a PBS documentary tracing the ethnic history of Irish immigrants to the United States. 1998.
- Interview With A Vampire, a dramatic feature film starring Tom Cruise and Brad Pitt. 1994.
- Alan Villiers; The Quest of the Schooner Argus (1951 Charles Scribner's Sons) Includes pictures and narrative of interaction with Gazela.
