= Danmark (ship, 1932) =

Danish full-rigged training ship launched in 1932

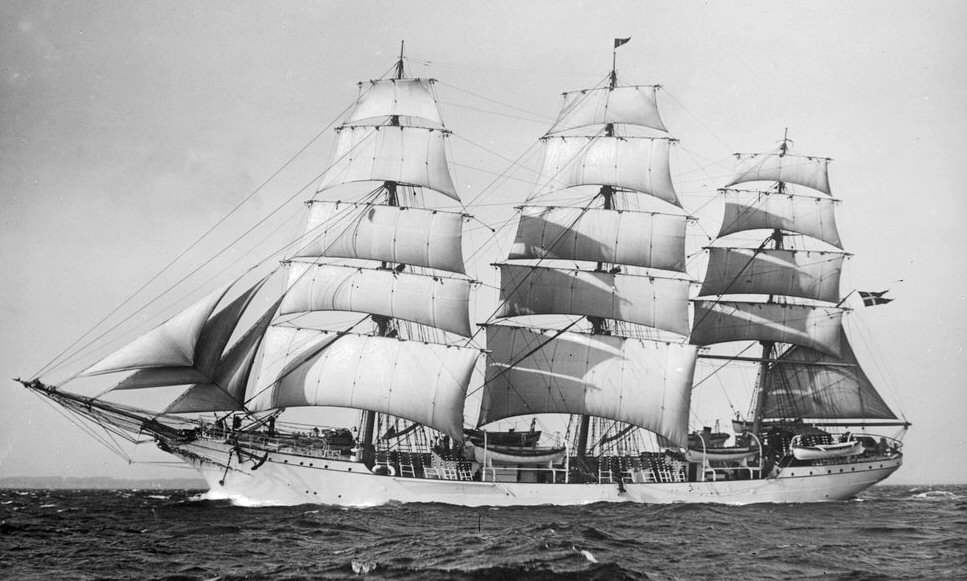
- Danmark (unknown date) by Allen C. Green courtesy State Library of Victoria

History

Denmark
- Name: Danmark
- Owner: Danish Maritime Authority
- Builder: Nakskov, Lolland
- Launched: 1932
- In service: 1933
- Identification: IMO number: 5086279; MMSI number: 219500000; Callsign: OXDK
- Status: In active service as of 2025

General characteristics
- Tonnage: 790 GRT
- Length: 252 ft (77 m)
- Beam: 32 ft (9.8 m)
- Draft: 17 ft (5.2 m)
- Propulsion: Diesel engine, sails
- Sail plan: full-rigged; 26 sails
- Complement: 15 crew; 80 trainees

Danmark is a full-rigged ship owned by the Danish Maritime Authority and based at the Maritime Training and Education Centre in Frederikshavn, Denmark.

== Description ==
Danmark is 252 feet (77 m) in overall length with a beam of 32 feet (9.8 m) and a depth of 17 feet (5.2 m), and with a gross tonnage of 790 tons. She was designed for a crew complement of 120, but in a 1959 refit this was reduced to 80. Although she is equipped with a 486-hp diesel engine capable of 9 knots (17 km/h), in other respects she retains many primitive features: for example, the steering gear lacks any mechanical assistance, and the stock anchors are raised by a capstan rather than a powered windlass. The permanent crew have berths, but the trainees sleep in hammocks.

== History ==
Danmark succeeded København, a five-masted barque which was lost mysteriously at sea at the end of 1928, as Denmark's principal training ship. Launched in 1932 at the Nakskov Shipyard in Lolland and fitted out the following year, she was built to train officers of the Danish merchant marine. In 1939 she visited the United States to participate in the 1939 Worlds Fair in New York City, but at the outbreak of hostilities in World War II she was ordered to remain in US waters to avoid capture by the Germans. She was then based in Jacksonville, Florida, and maintained with the help of the Danish American community there.

After the attack on Pearl Harbor the captain, Knud L. Hansen, offered the ship to the U.S. government as a training vessel. This offer was accepted, and Danmark moved to New London, Connecticut, to train cadets at the United States Coast Guard Academy there. Approximately five thousand cadets were trained before the ship was returned to Denmark in 1945. Her designation in the U.S. Coast Guard was USCGC Danmark (WIX-283). She resumed her training duties the following year. In recognition of her wartime service, a bronze plaque was placed on the mainmast, and Danmark was given the honor of leading the parade of ships at the 1964 Worlds Fair in New York. Experience with Danmark led to the acquisition of the USCGC Eagle from Germany at the end of the war as a training vessel.

Training voyages continue to be offered, not only to Danes but also to those of any nation interested in learning the basics of seamanship on a large sailing vessel.

The ship was one of seven ships used in filming the British BBC TV-series Onedin Line (1971-1980).

The ship was involved in a collision with USS Minneapolis-Saint Paul in September 2022. Danmark was being towed by a tugboat at the time.

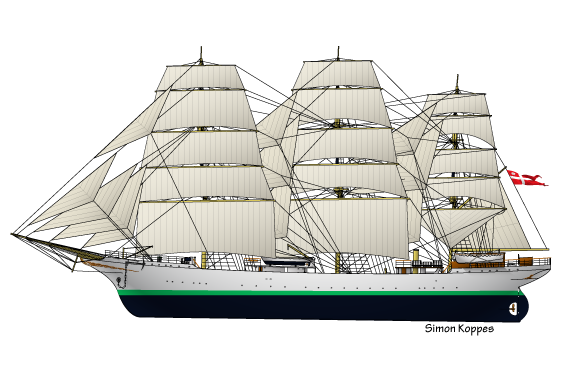
Line art of the Danmark
