= NRP Sagres =

NRP Sagres is the name of the following ships:

- NRP Sagres (1896)
- NRP Sagres (1937), tall ship and school ship

== See also ==
- Sagres (disambiguation)
