= Guayas (chief) =

Guayas was a legendary chief of the Huancavilcas in the coastal plains of today Ecuador. The Huancavilcas lived in the area of today's Guayaquil at the time of the arrival of the Spanish.

The city of Guayaquil was named after Guayas and his wife Quila. The sailing school ship Guayas is also named after him.
