= KRI Dewaruci =

Sailing vessel from the Indonesian Navy

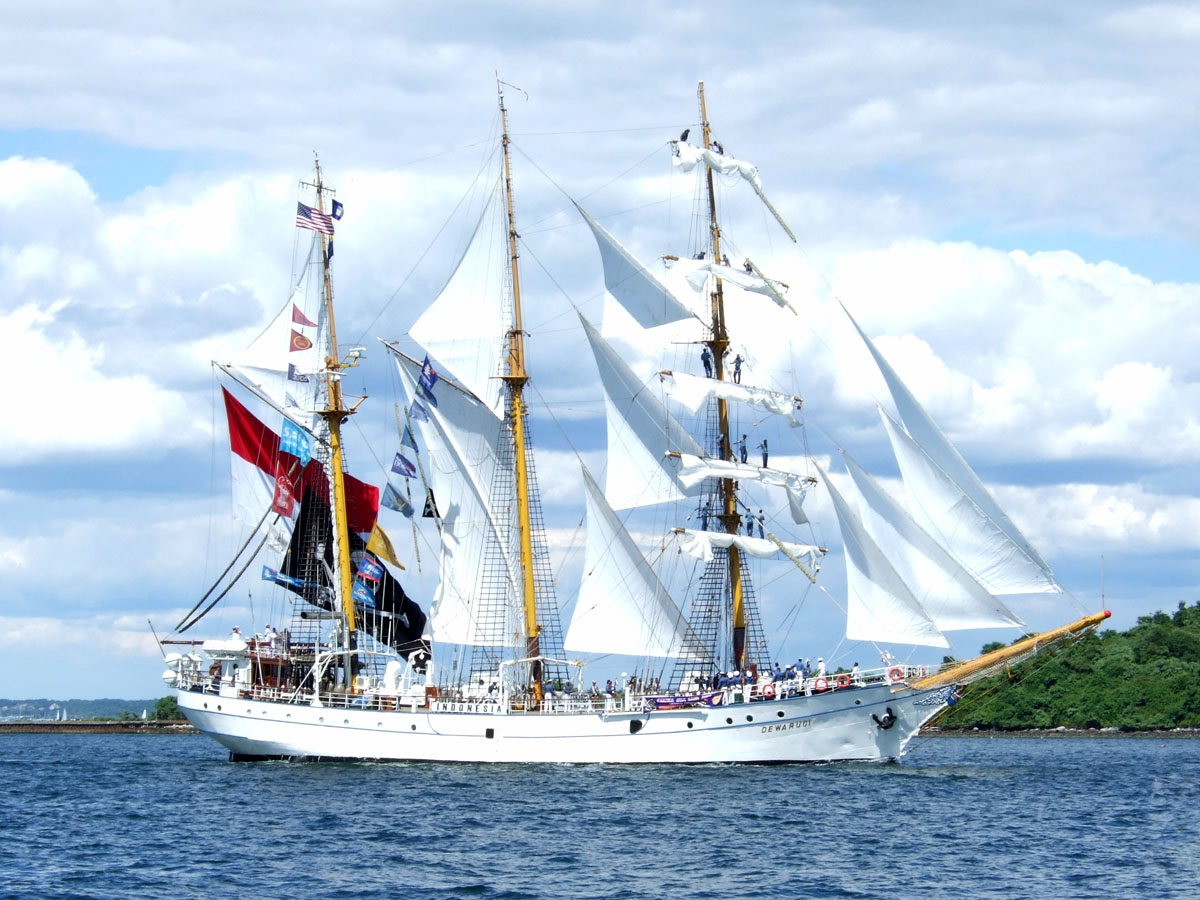
- KRI Dewaruci

History

Indonesia
- Name: KRI Dewaruci
- Commissioned: 1953
- Identification: MMSI number: 525002050; Callsign: PKOE
- Status: Active

General characteristics
- Type: Barquentine
- Displacement: 847 tons
- Length: 58.3 metres (191 ft)
- Beam: 9.5 metres (31 ft)
- Height: 36.5 metres (120 ft)
- Draught: 4.05 metres (13.3 ft)
- Propulsion: 1 x 986 hp (735 kW) diesel engine, with a 4 blade propeller
- Sail plan: 16 sails, 1,091 square metres (11,740 sq ft)
- Speed: 10.5 knots (19.4 km/h; 12.1 mph) with the engine; 9 knots (17 km/h; 10 mph) under sail
- Complement: 81 crew and 75 cadets

KRI Dewaruci (sometimes spelled Dewa Ruci or Dewarutji) is a Class A tall ship and the only barquentine owned and operated by the Indonesian Navy. She is used as a sail training vessel for naval cadets and is the largest tall ship in the Indonesian fleet. Dewaruci also serves as a goodwill ambassador for Indonesia to the rest of the world.

Built in Germany by H. C. Stülcken Sohn at Steinwerder, Hamburg. Construction of Dewaruci began in 1932, but was suspended due to the outbreak of World War II, which caused heavy damage to the shipyard where she was being constructed. She was launched on 24 January 1953 and completed on 9 July that year. Since then, she has been based at Surabaya on the Java Sea. Her name and figurehead represent and display the mythological Javanese wayang god of truth and courage. The vessel was also used in the making of Anna and the King movie, starring Jodie Foster.

Dewaruci also participates in tall ship races and events around the world. As a unique feature, the ship has her own marching band. In 2010 Dewaruci's marching band delighted and entertained the crowds in Hartlepool at the Tall Ships Crew Parade. Their energy, enthusiasm, and skill won them the prize for the best crew in the crew parade.

Due to her age, Dewaruci is to be decommissioned and displayed at a naval museum. The Indonesian Parliament has agreed to buy a new tall ship and has appropriated $80 million (Rp720 billion) for the purpose. The new vessel is to be completed in 2014.

The three masts are named after three of the sons of Pandu, from the Pandava. Foremast, named "Bima"—35.3 metres (116 ft))

1. Flying jib
2. Outer jib
3. Middle jib
4. Inner jib
5. Royal
6. Topgallant
7. Upper topsail
8. Lower topsail
9. Foresail

Mainmast, named "Arjuna"—35.9 metres (118 ft)

1. Main topgallant
2. Main topmast staysail
3. Main staysail
4. Main topsail
5. Mainsail

Mizzenmast, named "Yudhistira"—32.5 metres (107 ft)

1. Mizzen topsail
2. Mizzen
