= RNOV Shabab Oman =

Two ships of the Royal Navy of Oman have been named Shabab Oman:

- RNOV Shabab Oman (1977), a barquentine
- RNOV Shabab Oman (2013), a full-rigged ship
