= Clipper City (schooner) =

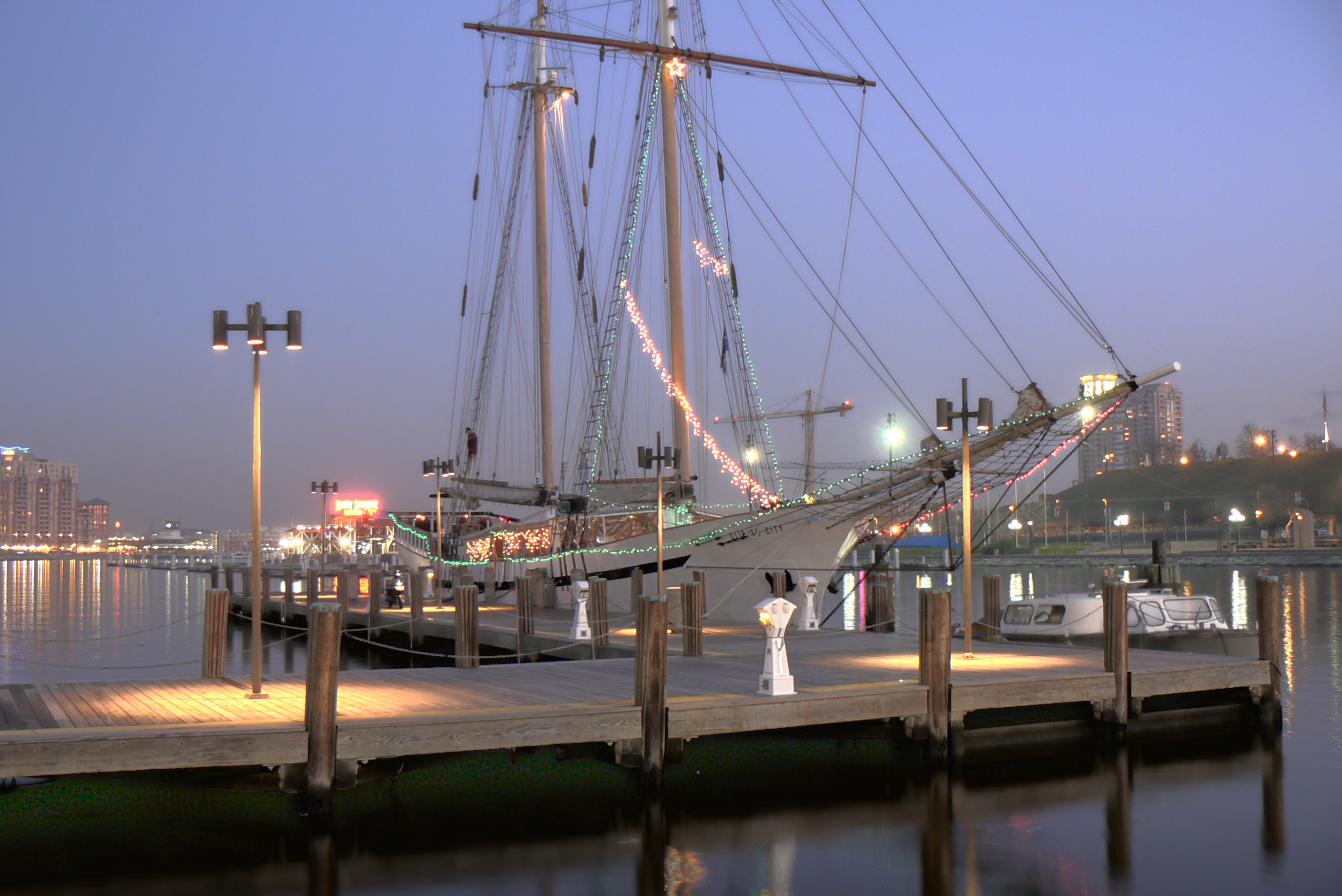
- The 1984 replica of the Clipper City

History

United States
- Name: Clipper City
- Operator: Manhattan by Sail.com
- Ordered: 1984
- Builder: Haglund Boatworks, Green Cove Springs, Florida
- Home port: New York, NY
- Identification: 688904

General characteristics
- Class & type: Topsail Schooner
- Tonnage: 99.5
- Displacement: 200 tons
- Length: 158 ft (48 m)
- Beam: 27.5 ft (8.4 m)
- Height: 135 ft (41 m) from waterline
- Draft: 14 ft (4.3 m) w/ centerboard, 6 ft (1.8 m) w/o
- Propulsion: Sail; auxiliary engine
- Sail plan: Two-masted square-topsail gaff schooner, 9,836 square feet (913.8 m^{2}) total sail area
- Capacity: 150 persons (not including crew)
- Crew: 9

Clipper City is a modern replica of a nineteenth-century cargo schooner.

== The original Clipper City ==
The first Clipper City was a cargo clipper schooner built in Manitowoc, Wisconsin in 1854. Manitowoc soon became known for its shipbuilding industry, and "Clipper City" was adopted as a nickname for the town itself. A replica cross section of the Clipper City is on permanent display at the Wisconsin Maritime Museum.

== The replica ==
In 1984, the plans for the original Clipper City were purchased from the Smithsonian Institution, and naval architects DeJong & Lebet, Inc. were hired to adapt the design to meet modern safety requirements. The new vessel, also named Clipper City, was a steel-hulled schooner carrying eight sails on two steel masts: six fore-and-aft rigged sails, and two square topsails.

The Clipper City offered passenger sails out of Baltimore, Maryland for over twenty years, with occasional trips to the Caribbean and other destinations.

== Current status ==
In 2007, Clipper City's then owner, John Kircher, filed for bankruptcy to avoid foreclosure on the vessel by Regal Bancorp, Inc. Clipper City's Coast Guard certification was revoked shortly thereafter due to a hull failure. Following a brief seizure by U.S. Marshals, the vessel was sold at auction to Regal Bancorp for $350,000.

Clipper City was then purchased by ESV Corp and rebuilt to original condition. She operates as a day sail tour boat, running out of Battery Park in New York City, and is also available for private charters and corporate events by Manhattan By Sail.

== See also ==
- List of schooners
