= ARC Gloria =

Sailing ship built in 1968

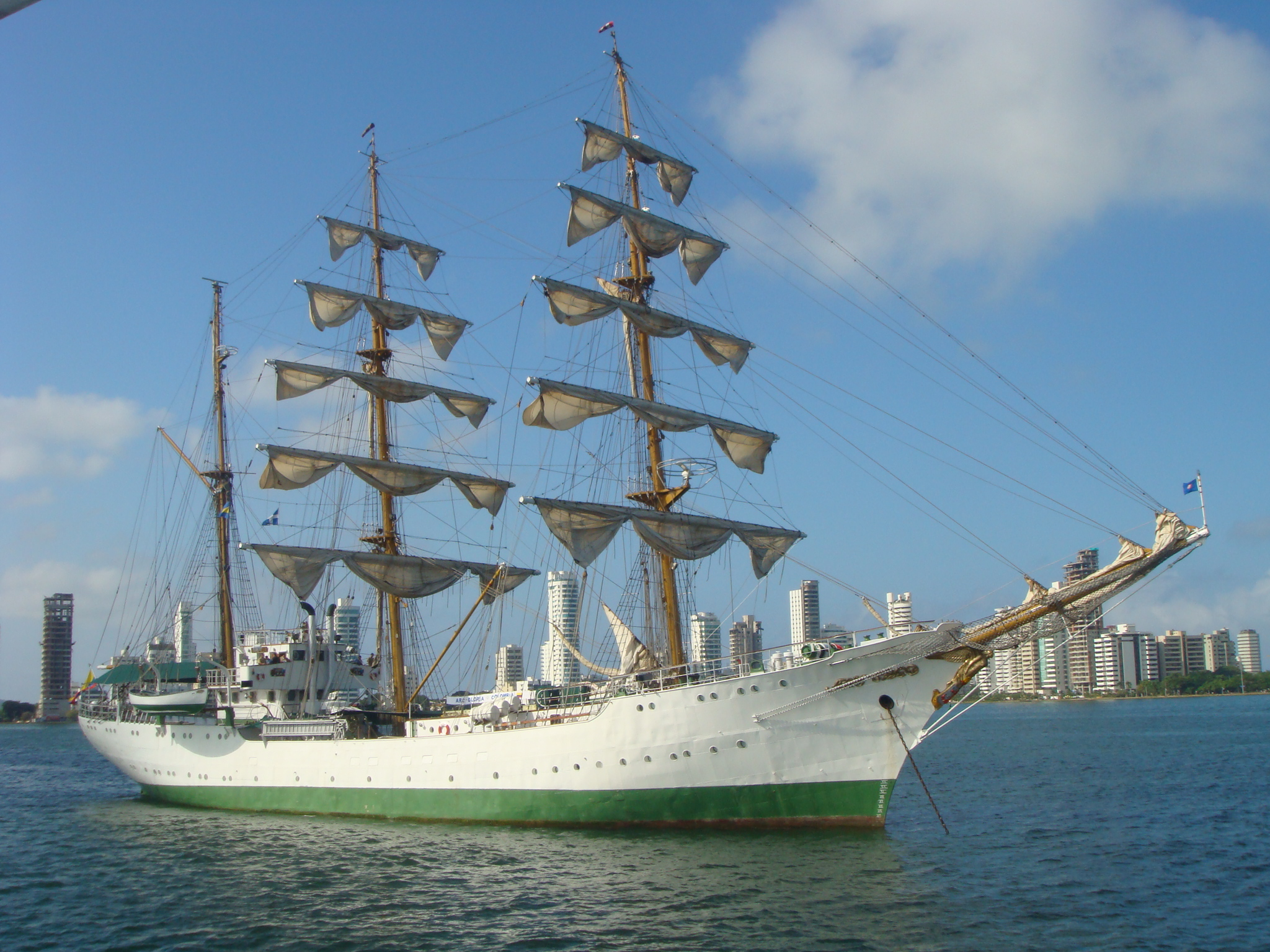
- ARC Gloria in 2007.

History

Colombia
- Name: Gloria
- Namesake: Gloria Zawadsky De Rebeiz
- Ordered: 6 October 1966
- Builder: Astilleros Celaya S.A., Bilbao, Spain
- Laid down: April 1967
- Launched: 2 December 1967
- Commissioned: 7 September 1968
- Identification: IMO number: 8642555; MMSI number: 730010001; Callsign: 5KMT
- Status: Active

General characteristics
- Type: Barque
- Displacement: 1,300 tons
- Length: 64.7 m (212 ft 3 in)
- Beam: 10.6 m (34 ft 9 in)
- Draft: 6.6 m (21 ft 8 in)
- Propulsion: Diesel, 500 hp (370 kW)
- Sail plan: 1,400 m^{2} (15,000 sq ft)
- Speed: 10 knots (19 km/h; 12 mph) under power

ARC Gloria (IMO number: 8642555) is a training ship and official flagship of the Colombian Navy. She is a three-masted steel-hulled barque.

The Colombian Government authorized its navy to acquire a training ship in 1966. A contract was signed with the Spanish shipyard Celaya of Bilbao in October 1966, and began to be fulfilled in April 1967. The ship was commissioned on 7 September 1968 with the vessel moored at the wharf of Deusto Channel. With striking similarities to the sister ships built from the 1930s to 1958 by the German firm Blohm & Voss (first Gorch Fock, USCGC Eagle, NRP Sagres, Mircea, Herbert Norkus and current Gorch Fock), she is also one of four similar barques built as sail training vessels for Latin American navies; her half-sisters are the Mexican Cuauhtémoc, the Venezuelan Simón Bolívar and the Ecuadoran Guayas.

She was named after Gloria Zawadsky De Rebeiz, the wife of General Gabriel Rebéiz Pizarro who was the Minister of Defense that authorized her construction but died before her completion. Apart from being a training ship she also serves a secondary role as a sailing ambassador for her home country.

== History ==
The history of the ARC Gloria dates back to 1964, when, the Commander of the Navy, Vice Admiral Orlando Lemaitre Torres, pushed for the acquisition by the Colombian Government of a sailing vessel in the configuration of a Three-masted barque, with the aim of using it as a Training Ship of for the Colombian Navy. Lemaitre frequently brought up the subject at work as well as during social meetings with other military commanders. Finally after intense lobbying, the Minister of Defense, General Gabriel Rebéiz Pizarro, convinced of the need for the ship and in front of several officials at a social meeting celebrating Navy Day (July 24), expressed his approval of the project and to confirm his decision he grabbed a napkin where he wrote “Valid for a Sailboat” signing it with his name. After this curious pact, the Colombian Government through executive decree 111 of January 1966, authorized the construction of the ship. The formal contract was signed on October 6 of the same year with the Spanish Naval Construction Firm based in Bilbao and with construction starting in April 1967. On the 2nd of December of the same year in question, the hull launching ceremony took place with the Minister of Defense's wife; Gloria Zawadsky De Rebeiz, in attendance she would also be the ship's namesake. General Rebeiz died before the work for which he fought for was finished.

After her completion she was officially commissioned into the Colombian Navy on September 7, 1968 while docked on the Deusto Canal. Her maiden voyage began October 9 when she left the port of Ferrol bound for Cartagena de Indias where she would arrive on November 11, 1968.
