= BAE Guayas (BE-21) =

Ecuadorian sail training ship

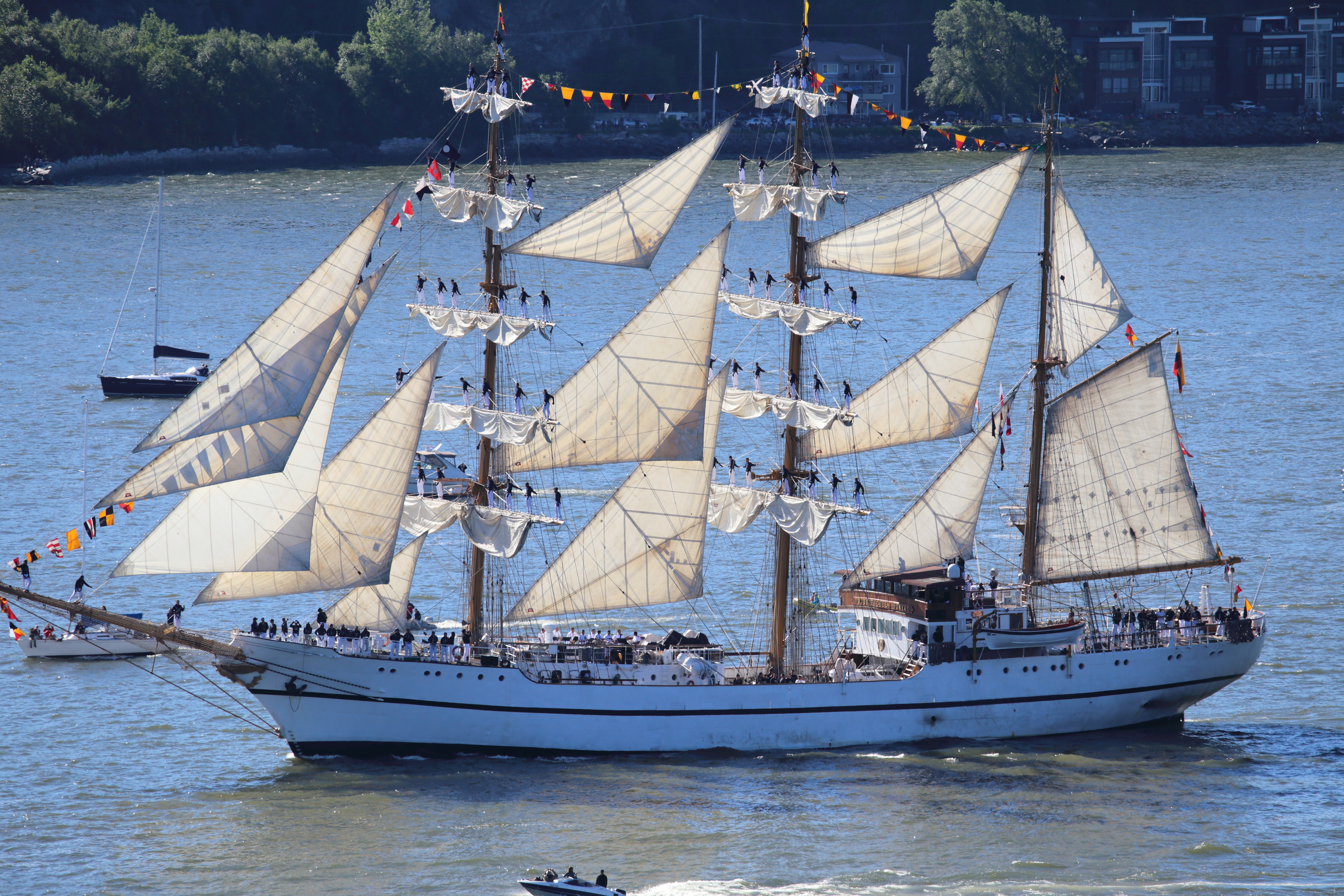
- BAE Guayas at Quebec City, 2017

History

Ecuador
- Name: Guayas
- Owner: Armada del Ecuador
- Builder: Astilleros Celaya S.A., Bilbao, Spain
- Yard number: 157
- Launched: September 23, 1976
- Completed: July 23, 1977
- Commissioned: July 23, 1977
- Homeport: Guayaquil, Ecuador
- Identification: Call sign: HCEG; IMO number: 7605043; MMSI number: 735059037; Pennant number: (BE-51); 6126970
- Status: in active service

General characteristics
- Type: Steel-hulled barque
- Tonnage: 934 gross tonnage (GT); 234 DWT
- Displacement: 1,300 long tons (1,321 t)
- Length: 78.40 m (257 ft 3 in) (LOA); 56.10 m (184 ft 1 in) (pp)
- Beam: 10.16 m (33 ft 4 in)
- Draught: 4.40 m (14 ft 5 in)
- Depth: 6.60 m (21 ft 8 in)
- Propulsion: General Motors diesel, 700 hp (520 kW)
- Sail plan: 1,410 m^{2} (15,200 sq ft)
- Capacity: 80 trainees
- Crew: 35 officers and 120 crew

Guayas is a sail training ship of the Ecuadorian Navy. Launched in 1976, it was named in jointly in honor of Chief Guayas, the Guayas river, and Guayas, the first steamship that was constructed in South America in 1841, and is displayed on the Ecuadorian coat of arms. The ship's home base is Guayaquil, Ecuador.

== Description ==
Guayas is a three-masted barque with a steel hull that can display a sailing area of 1,410 square metres (15,200 sq ft). The main mast reaches 38 metres (124 ft 8 in) over deck. The ship carries a crew of about 120 sailors as well as eighty cadets under the leadership of about 35 officers. Guayas is one of four sailing ships that were built by Astilleros Celaya S.A. in Bilbao, Gloria (Colombia) being the most similar ship; the other two sister ships are Simón Bolívar (Venezuela), and Cuauhtémoc (Mexico). These four ships basic design is very similar to Blohm & Voss' Gorch Fock that was built more than four decades earlier.

It is classified as a Class A Tall Ship by Sail Training International (STI) and has the MMSI number 735059037.

== History ==
In 2002 the Guayas undertook a voyage along the west coast of North America with port of calls at Acapulco, San Diego, Los Angeles, Monterey, San Francisco, and Seattle. In 2008, the Guayas crossed the Pacific Ocean to visit Vladivostok, Japan, Korea, and China. On the Osaka-Pusan-Shanghai leg of this her first Asian trip the Guayas took aboard an officer of the Chinese navy for reefing training. By the end of 2008 the Guayas had visited 60 harbours in 25 countries and covered about 340,000 nautical miles (630,000 km) in its life.

In 2010, she participated in Velas Sudamerica 2010, an historical Latin American tour by eleven tall ships to celebrate the bicentennial of the first national governments of Argentina and Chile.

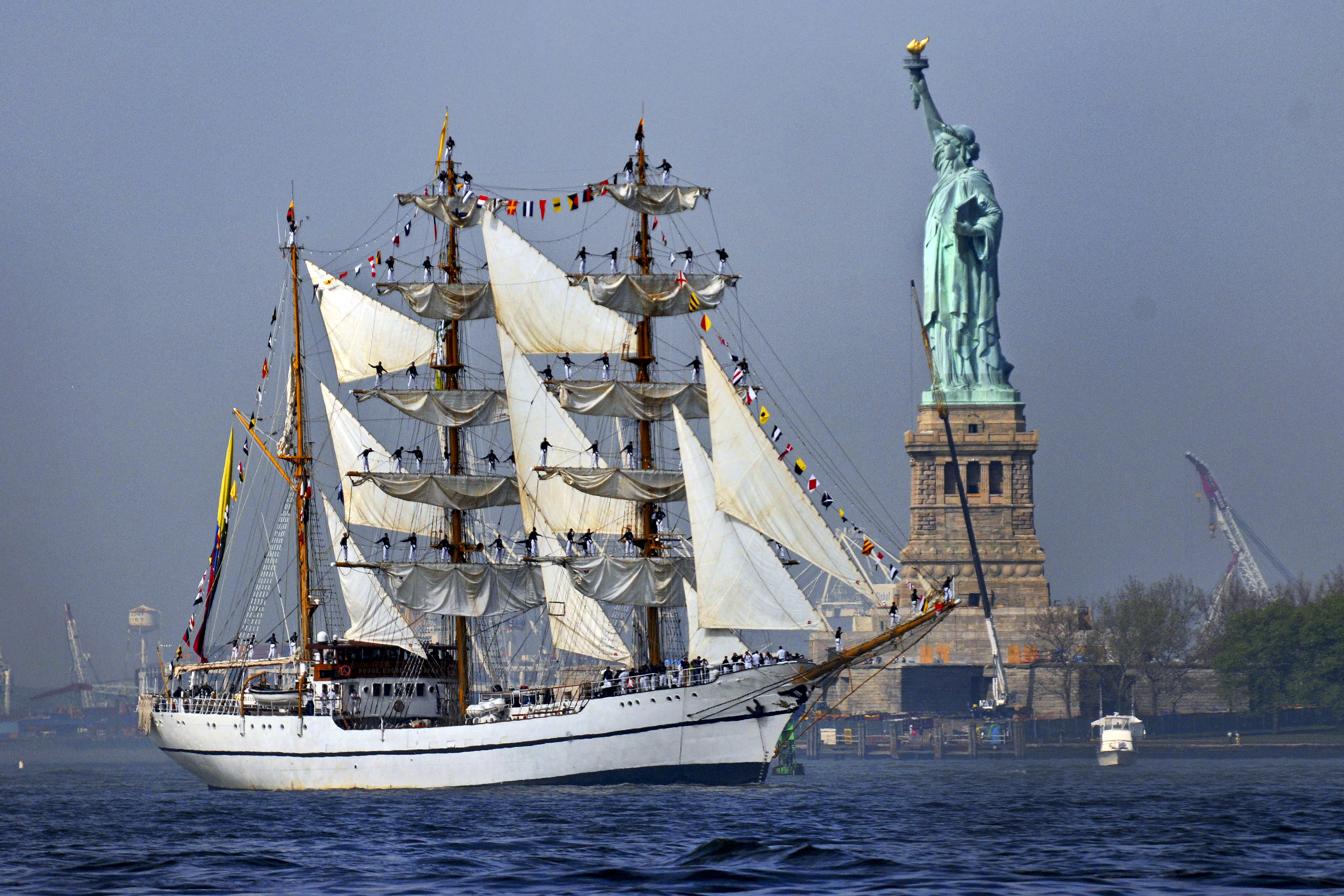
Guayas, New York, 2012

Guayas has also participated in OpSail 2012, visiting New York, Norfolk, Baltimore, and Boston, before proceeding to Europe. In the same year, it participated in the Tall Ships Race 2012.

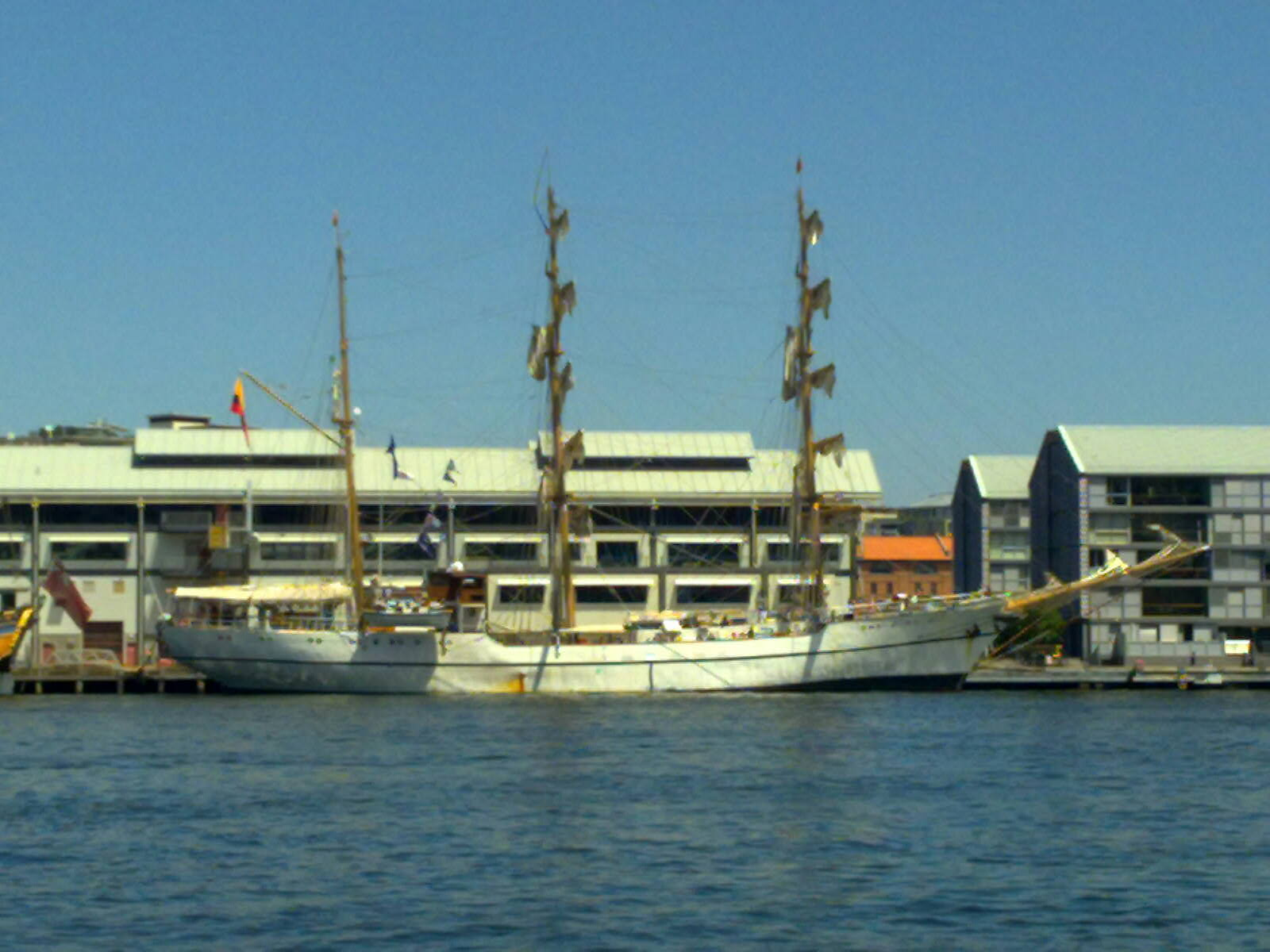
Guayas, Sydney, January 2016.

On 8 January 2016, Guayas arrived in Sydney as part of a round-the-world training cruise, the longest (35,000 nautical miles) such cruise performed so far by this ship, during which 22 countries will be visited. This is the first visit to Australia since 1988.

In October 2021, Guayas interdicted and captured a narco-submarine off the coast of Colombia. Guayas' crew arrested the submarine's four-person crew and seized its cargo, which was estimated by USNI News as being 1.5 to 6 short tons (1.4 to 5.4 t) of cocaine.
