= List of ships named ARM Cuauhtémoc =

ARM Cuauhtémoc may refer to one of the following ships of the Mexican Navy:

- ARM Cuauhtémoc (E01), the former American Fletcher-class destroyer USS Harrison (DD-573), launched in May 1942; acquired by the Mexican Navy in August 1970; taken out of service in 1982
- ARM Cuauhtémoc (BE01), a sail training vessel of the Mexican Navy launched in January 1982; in active service
