= When and If =

1939 Yacht

History

United States
- Name: When and If
- Builder: FF Pendleton
- Commissioned: 1939
- Homeport: Key West
- Status: Active

General characteristics
- Class & type: schooner
- Displacement: 43 tons (including ballast)
- Length: 63 ft 5 in (19.33 m) hull, 80 ft (24 m) (overall)
- Beam: 15 ft (4.6 m)
- Propulsion: Lugger Diesel (110 horsepower)

When and If is a yacht designed by John Alden and commissioned by then Colonel George S. Patton, a widely regarded American war hero. It was built in 1939 as a private yacht by boatbuilder F.F. Pendleton in Wiscasset, Maine. It was constructed of double planked mahogany over black locust frames and an oak keel.

== History ==
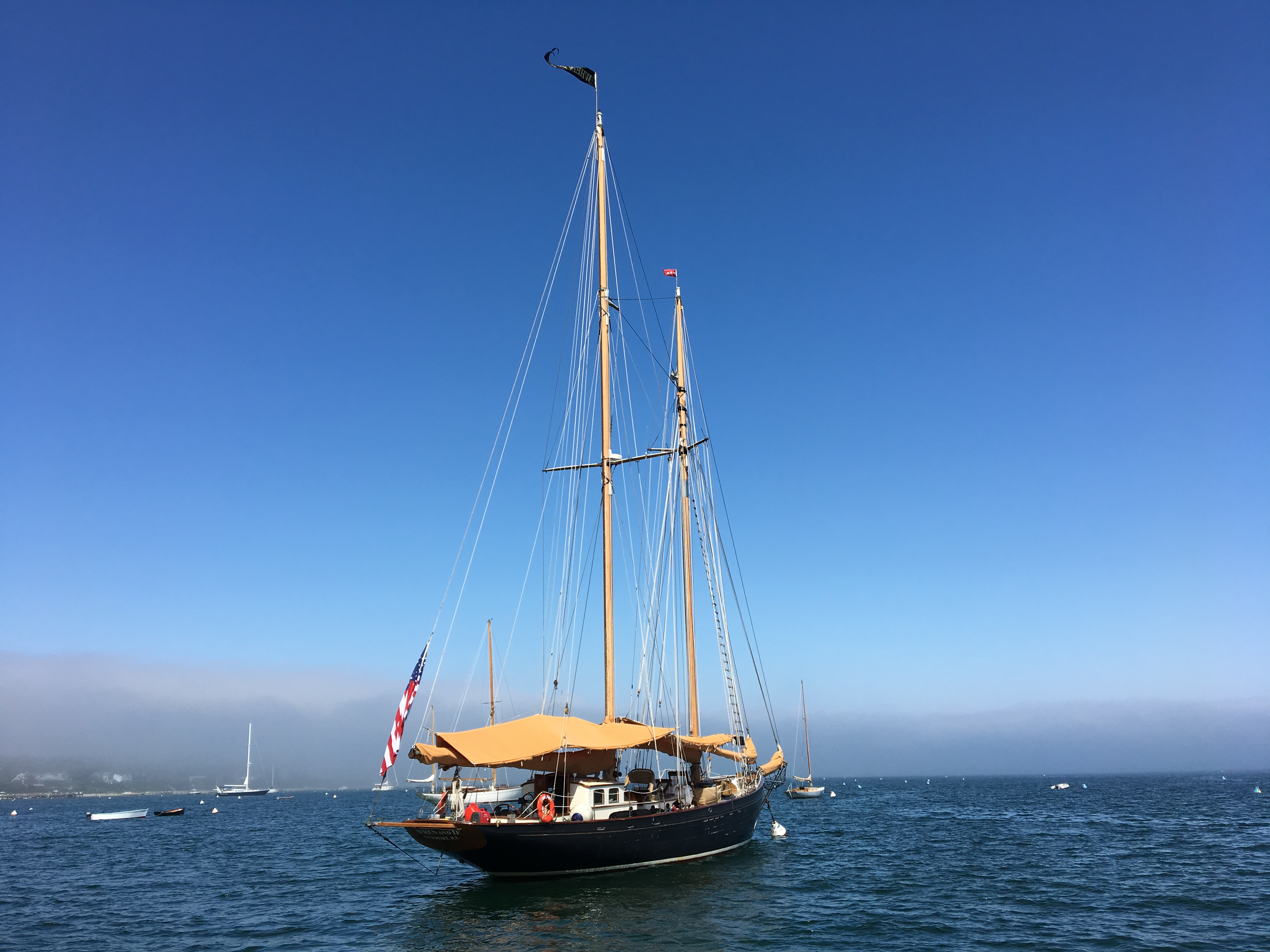
When and If yacht, anchored off Vineyard Haven, MA. Sep. 16, 2017.

=== Commissioning ===
When and If was commissioned after the Arcturus, with Patton and his wife Beatrice aboard, was badly damaged in a storm while en route to San Diego. Patton was hospitalized as a result, and while there, Beatrice contacted John Alden, the "world's most celebrated marine architect" at the time, to recruit him to design a new yacht along with Patton in the hopes of cheering him up.

Patton intended to sail the schooner around the world with his wife "when and if I return from the war", this phrase being the source of the yacht's name. He confided his plans to Clifford Swain, who drew the lines for the yacht. As Swain later recalled:

he was passed over twice for promotion to brigadier general by President Roosevelt and that if, as anticipated, he were passed over a third time, he would resigned from the army and cruise in [When and If] around Cape Horn to the West Coast and Catalina Island, which his family once owned."

Patton never fulfilled his dream after dying from injuries sustained in a car accident in 1945 near Speyer, Germany, shortly after the end of World War II.

=== Service and rebuilding ===
When and If remained in the harbor at Manchester-by-the-Sea in Massachusetts and was passed successively from Patton's wife to her brother Frederick Ayer and then on to his son. Frederick Ayer Jr. donated it to the Landmark School in Beverly, MA in 1972, where she was used for sail training programs for children with dyslexia.

Due to financial difficulties, arrangements were made to share ownership with Jim and Gina Mairs. However, in 1990 she broke loose in a gale and was wrecked. Assessed as a total loss, she was successfully salvaged and towed to the Gannon & Benjamin shipyard in Martha's Vineyard. Describing the state of the yacht Jill Bobrow wrote:

There was a huge gaping hole in her port side, broken frames, twisted cabin sole, thoroughly demolished interior, destroyed rudder, smashed keel – problems galore.

After a three-year rebuilding process, she was re-launched in 1994.

Her deck and transom were rebuilt in upstate New York in 2012; since then she has been actively sailing the East Coast of the United States. Purchased by Captain Seth Salzmann in 2015, she has been a part of Tall Ships Festivals in both 2015 and 2016, and in 2017 When and If sailed with Sail Training International to Bermuda, Boston and on to all corners of the Canadian Maritimes. Her home port in the winter is now Key West, where she offers public and private charters.

== Specifications ==
As of 2008, When and If was outfitted with a Lugger 110 HP diesel engine. Amenities included a Tasco propane stove, Sea Frost engine driven ice box, and a Double SS sink. The ship's sails were replaced with a new outfit by Sperry in 2010, with a total area of 1,770 square feet for the four lower sails.

== See also ==
- General George Patton Museum of Leadership
