= Vigilant =

Vigilant can refer to:

== Ships ==
- Vigilant (1790s Baltimore schooner), an American schooner that carried the mail and passenger traffic in the Danish West Indies for 130 years
- Vigilant (S 618), a French Navy ballistic missile submarine
- Vigilant (yacht), an American yacht, the winner of the 1893 America's Cup yacht race
- CGS Vigilant, a Canadian armed third-class cruiser and Great Lakes fisheries protection vessel
- HMC Vigilant, a British customs cutter of HM Customs and Excise
- HMRC Vigilant, two ships and a number of cutters of the British HM Customs and Excise
- HMS Vigilant, a number of ships of the British Royal Navy
- HSV Vigilant (JHSV-2), a ship of the United States Navy-led joint high-speed vessel program, later renamed USNS Choctaw County (T-EPF-2)
- USCGC Vigilant, more than one ship of the United States Coast Guard
- USRC Vigilant, more than one ship of the United States Revenue-Marine and United States Revenue Cutter Service
- USS Vigilant, more than one ship of the United States Navy
- Vigilant fireboat, operated by the Alexandria Fire Department

== Other ==
- Vigilant (novel), a 1999 novel by James Alan Gardner
- The Vigilant, a 1960s English-language newspaper published in Khartoum, Sudan
- Vigilant behavior, a personality trait
- Grob Vigilant, a glider manufactured by Grob Aerospace of Mindelheim Mattsies of Germany
- Vickers Vigilant, a British Army anti-tank guided missile
- The Vigilant (comics), a British comic book

== See also ==
- Vigilance (disambiguation)
- Vigilante (disambiguation)
