= Jacob Meindert =

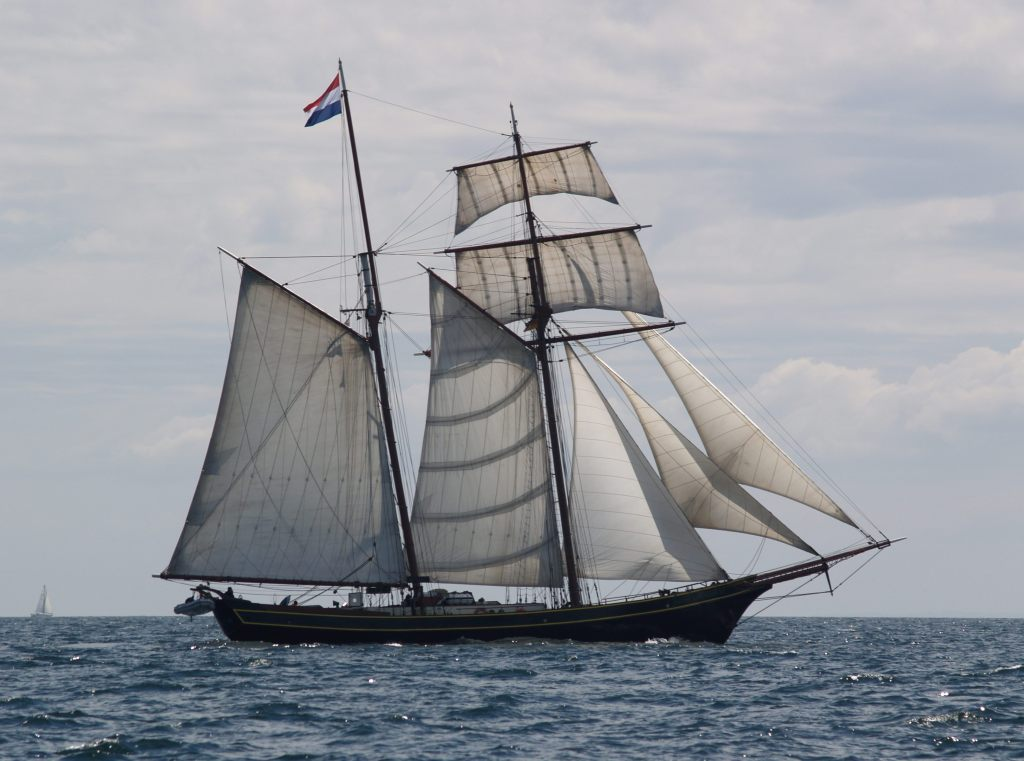

History

Malta
- Name: Jacob Meindert
- Port of registry: Malta
- Launched: 1953
- Refit: 1989

General characteristics
- Type: Baltimore clipper
- Displacement: 90 tonnes
- Length: 38 m (124 ft 8 in) (LOA); 24.6 m (80 ft 9 in) (LWL)
- Beam: 7.3 m (23 ft 11 in)
- Height: 28.6 m (93 ft 10 in)
- Draft: 2.5 m (8 ft 2 in)
- Propulsion: 256 hp (191 kW) DAF diesel engine
- Sail plan: 8 sails, 650 m^{2} (7,000 sq ft)
- Capacity: 40 daysail / 18 training voyages

Jacob Meindert, a Baltimore Clipper registered in Malta, is a 37-meter elegant sailing yacht that was originally an icebreaking tug named Oldeoog by Jadewerft in 1952.

The tug was purchased at auction by Willem Sligting who realised it could be converted into a fast sailing vessel following plans drawn up by Olivier van Meer. It was relaunched in 1989 as a two-masted Baltimore Clipper. In 2012, it lost both masts in strong wind north of Terschelling. There were no casualties and it was towed to the safety of the harbour of Harlingen.
