= Sail250 =

Tall ship tour of US ports for the country's 250th anniversary (2026)

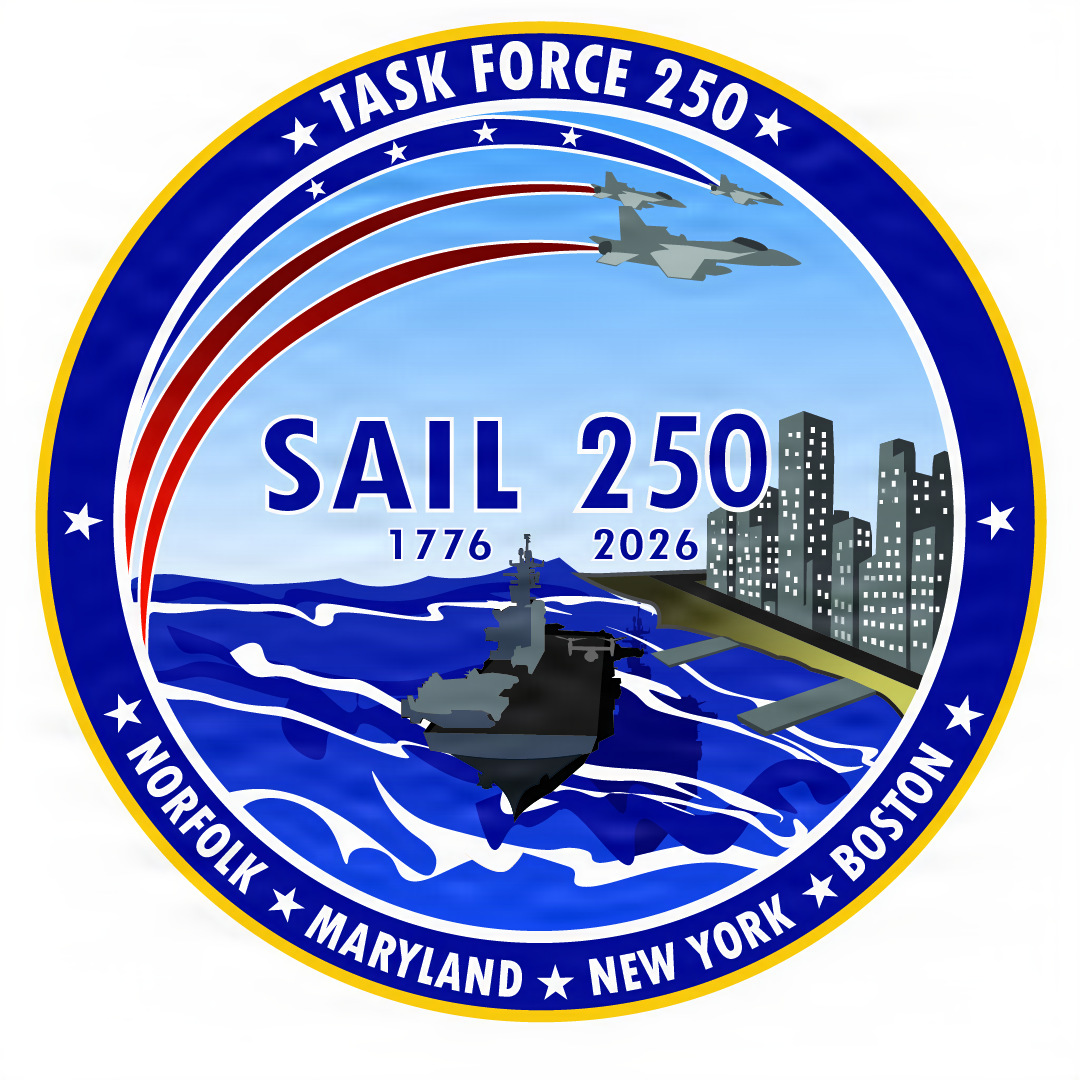

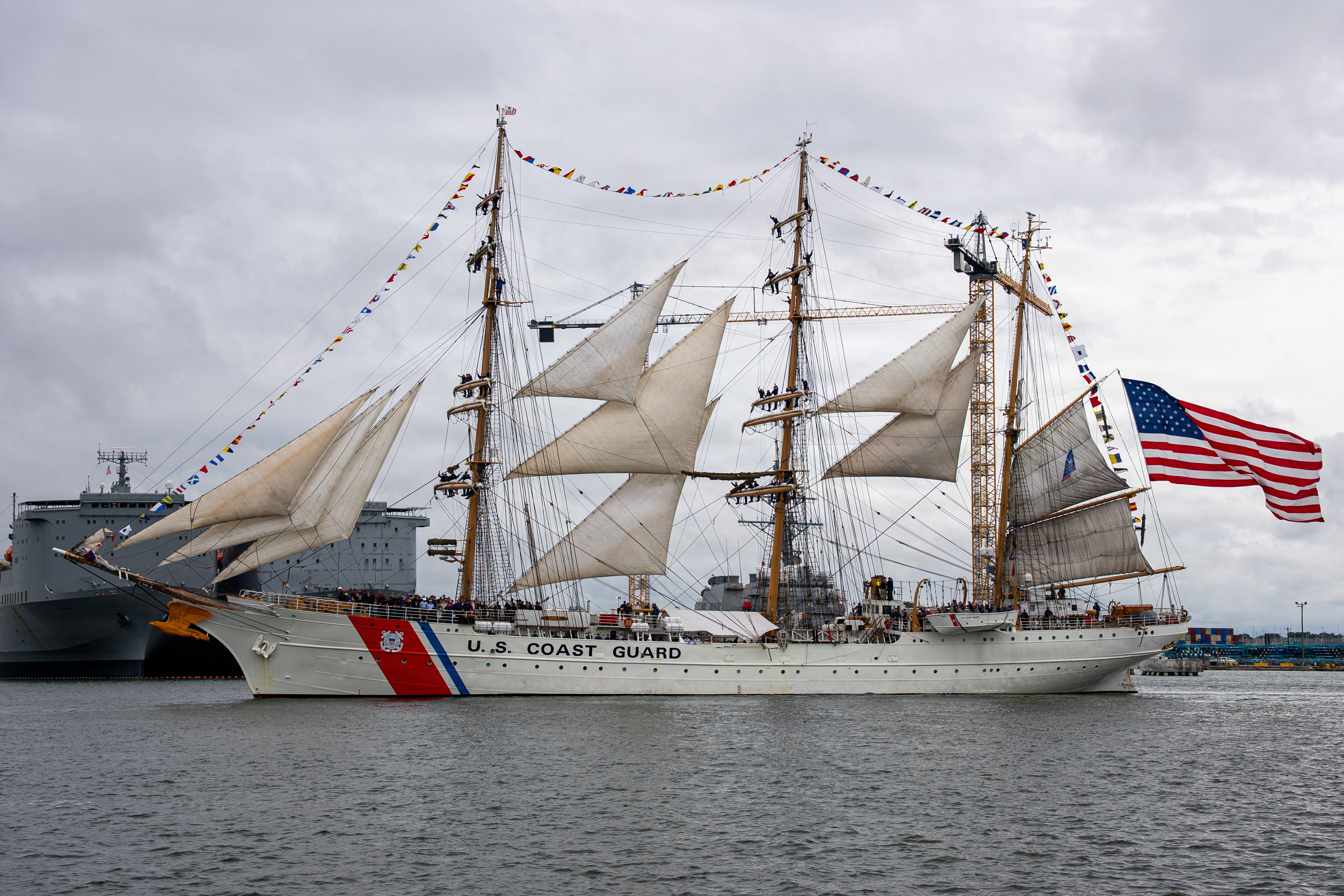
- USCGC Eagle, the designated flagship of the event, entering Norfolk harbor in June
- Genre: Tall ship and naval fleet gathering
- Date: May 27 – July 16, 2026
- Locations: New Orleans, Norfolk, Baltimore, New York City, Boston
- Country: United States
- Participants: Tall ships and naval vessels from more than 20 countries
- Organiser: Five-port consortium with America250, the United States Navy and local host organizations
- Website: sail250.org

Sail250 was a global gathering of tall ships and military ships that took place in five American port cities between May and July 2026 to mark the United States Semiquincentennial. An international fleet of more than 60 vessels, including naval training ships from more than 20 countries, visited New Orleans, Norfolk, Baltimore, New York and Boston in succession, with free public ship tours and parades at each port.

The New York segment, organized by the nonprofit Sail4th 250 as successor to Operation Sail, included an International Fleet Review and a Parade of Sail past the Statue of Liberty on July 4, 2026. With over 15,000 U.S. and foreign sailors, and around 6 million spectators, it was estimated to be the largest maritime gathering in United States history.

== Background ==
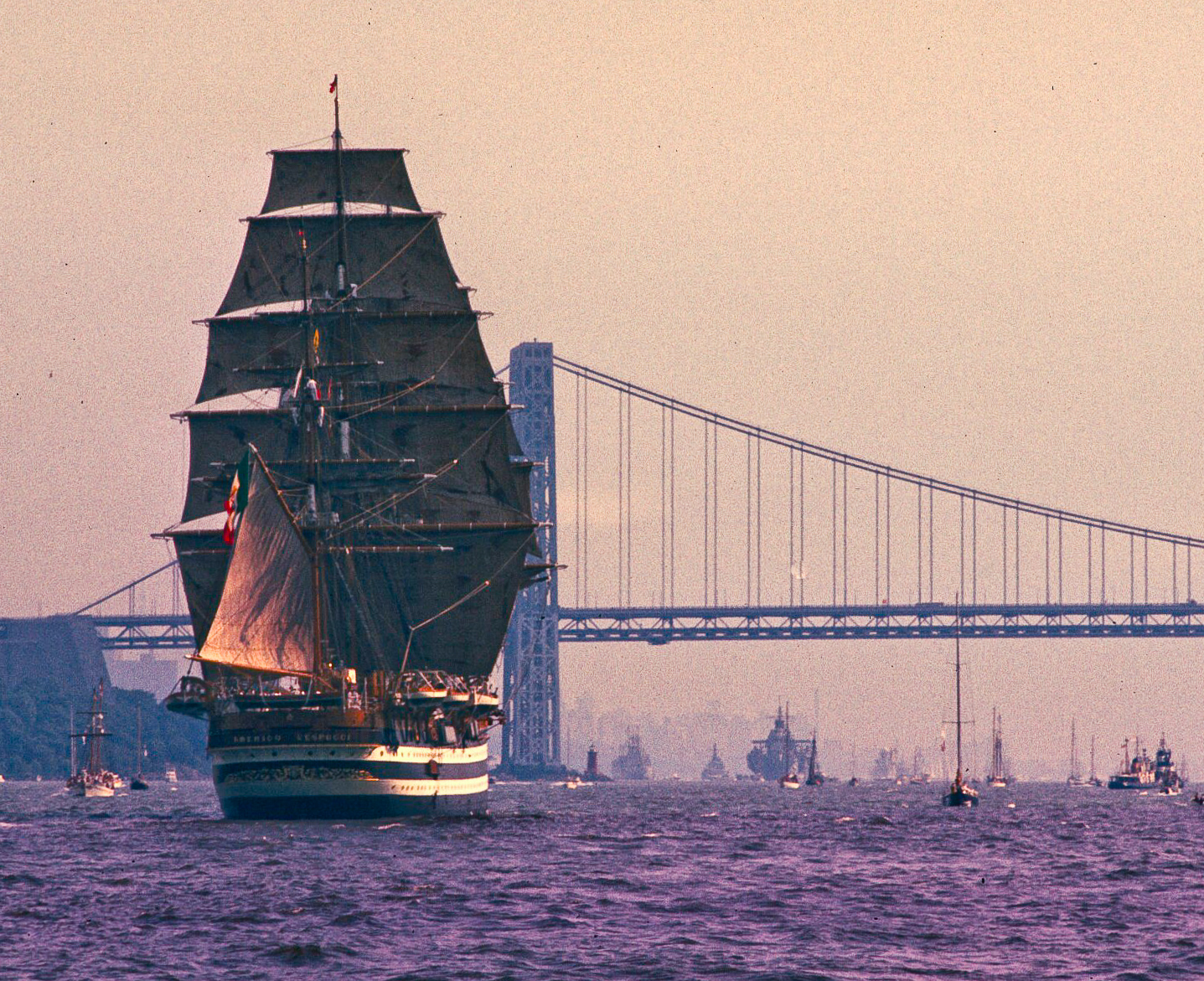
The Italian training ship Amerigo Vespucci in New York during OpSail 1976

Sail250 followed the tradition of Operation Sail, the international tall ship gatherings held in New York which took place for several events: the 1964 World's Fair, the 1976 United States Bicentennial, the Statue of Liberty centennial in 1986, the Columbus Quincentennial in 1992, the millennium celebration in 2000, and the bicentennial of "The Star-Spangled Banner" in 2012. The Norfolk segment of the 2026 event was announced as early as June 2023. In October 2025, America250, the congressionally chartered Semiquincentennial organization, announced a national partnership with Sail4th 250, the New York organizer.

=== Participants ===
The US Coast Guard tall ship Eagle acted as the flagship leading the fleet of participating vessels. Besides naval vessels of the US Navy, US Coast Guard and allied nations, some of the participating tall ships included: (Note: The list does not include all participants)

- A. J. Meerwald (United States)
- Amerigo Vespucci (Italy)
- Belle Poule (France)
- Bluenose II (Canada)
- Capitán Miranda (Uruguay)
- USS Constellation (United States)
- USS Constitution (United States)
- Denis Sullivan (United States)
- Dar Młodzieży (Poland)
- USCGC Eagle (United States)
- Elissa (United States)
- Ernestina-Morrissey (United States)
- Esmeralda (Chile)
- Gazela (United States)
- Gladan (Sweden)
- ARC Gloria (Colombia)
- Godspeed (United States)
- Gorch Fock (Germany)
- BAE Guayas (Ecuador)
- Juan Bautista Cambiaso (Dominican Republic)
- Juan Sebastián de Elcano (Spain)
- Kalmar Nyckel (United States)
- ARA Libertad (Argentina)
- Liberty Clipper (United States)
- Lynx (United States)
- Mircea (Romania)
- Oosterschelde (Netherlands)
- Picton Castle (Cook Islands)
- Pioneer (United States)
- Pride of Baltimore II (United States)
- NRP Sagres (Portugal)
- Spirit of Bermuda (Bermuda)
- INS Sudarshini (India)
- BAP Unión (Peru)
- Virginia (United States)
- When and If (United States)

During the events, Eagle and her remaining sister ships also met again for the first time since 1976.

Sister ships of USCGC Eagle participating in Sail250

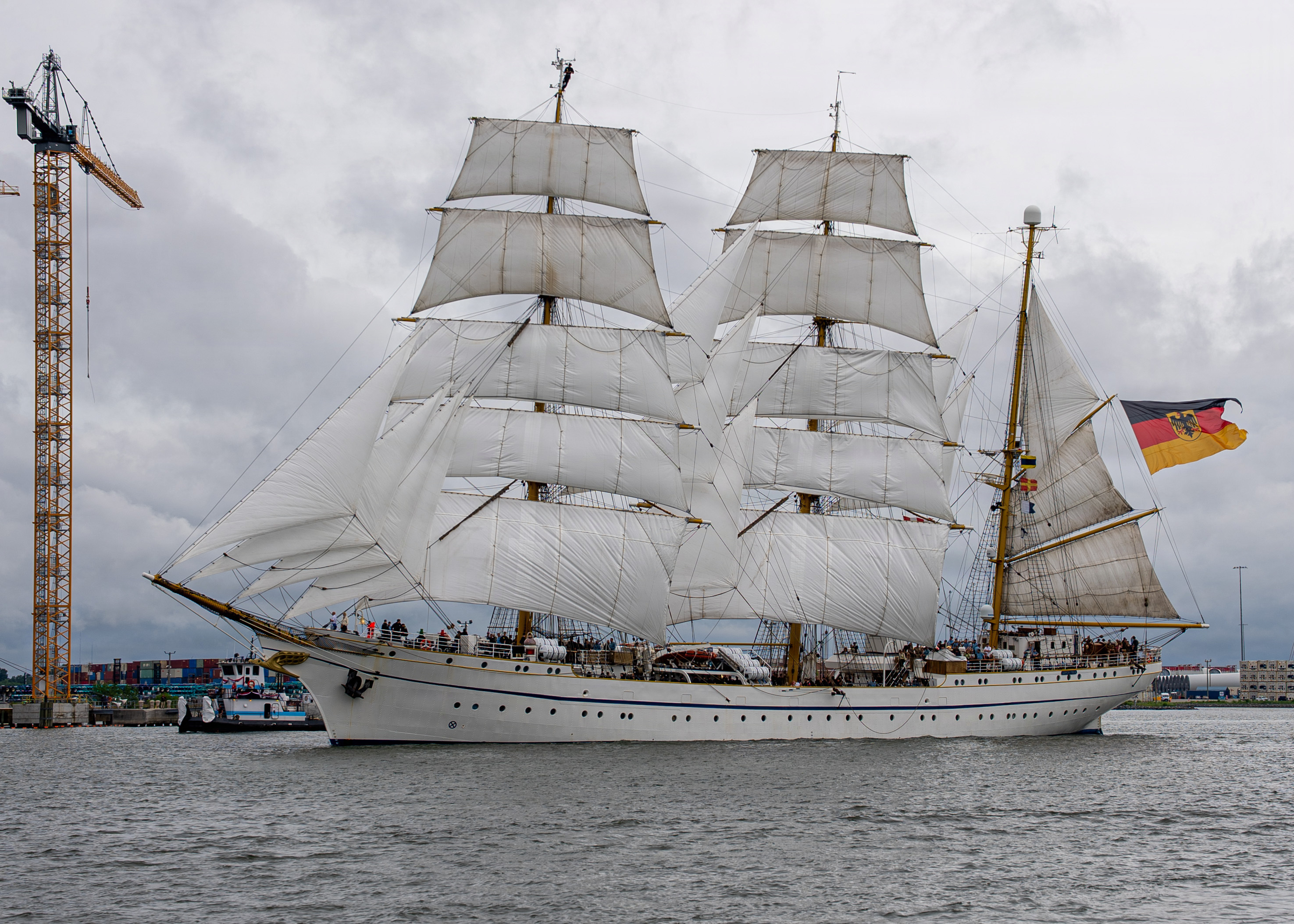
Gorch Fock

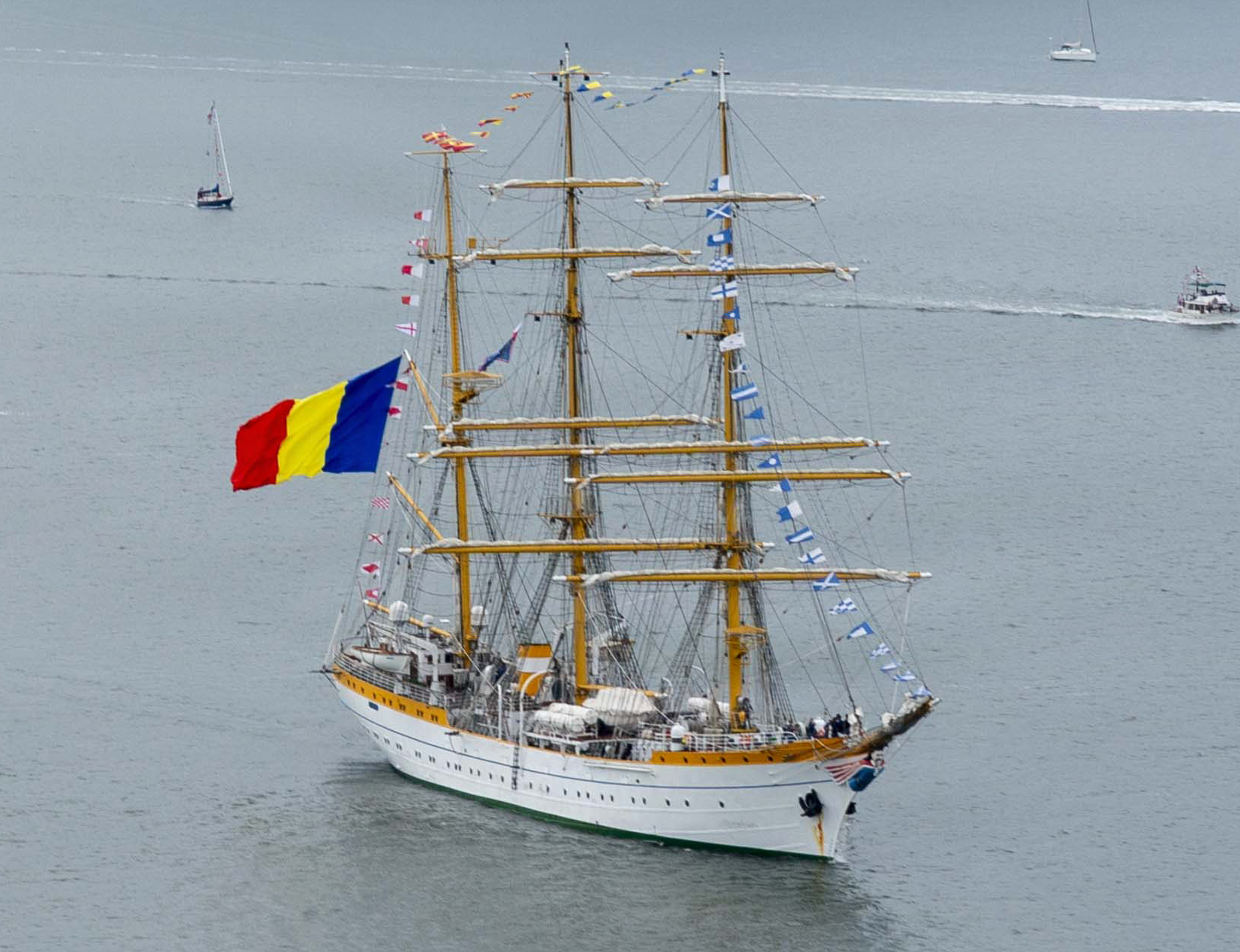
Mircea

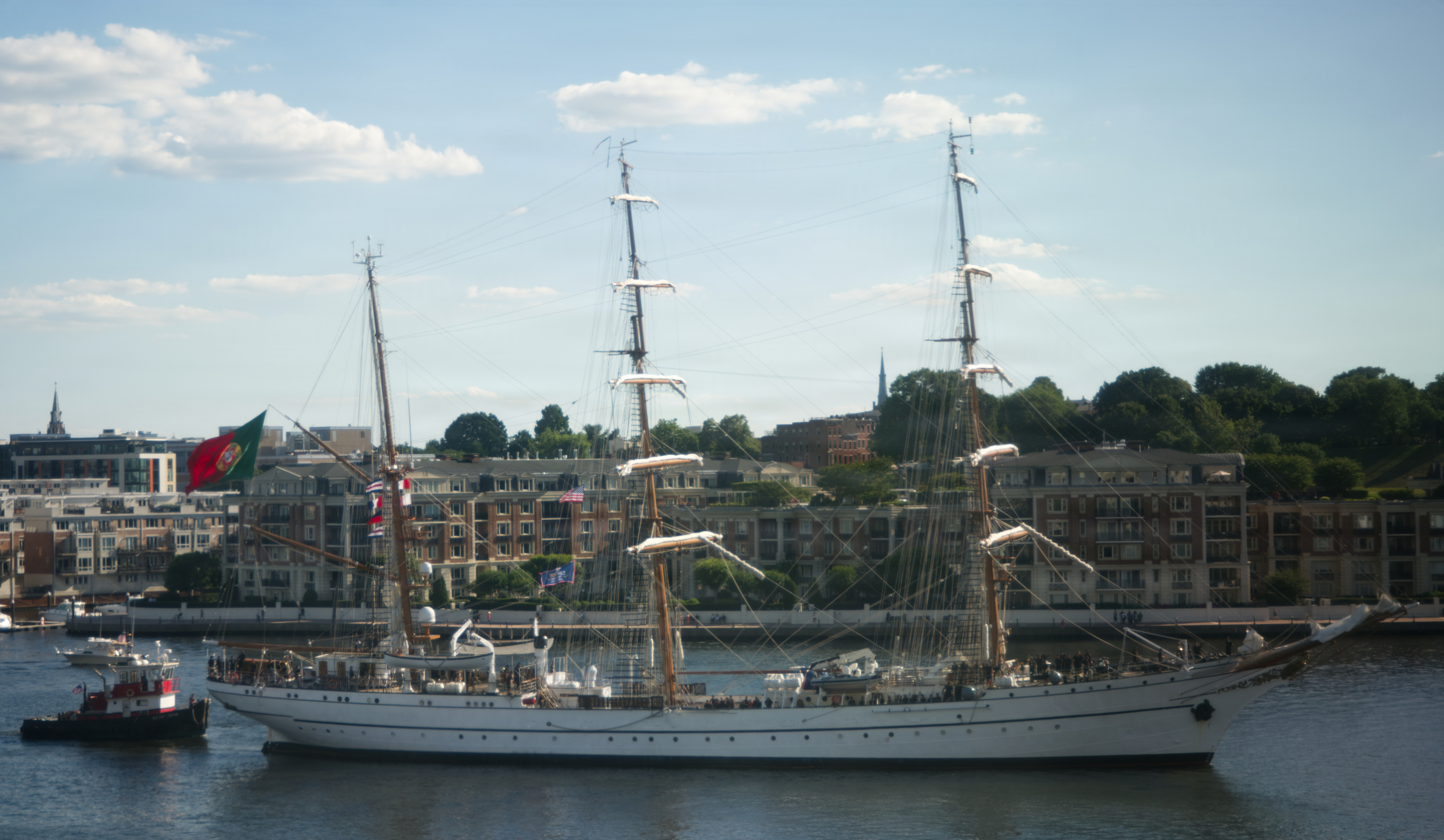
NRP Sagres

== Host ports ==
=== New Orleans (May 27 – June 1) ===
The tour opened at the Port of New Orleans, where ships arrived on the Mississippi riverfront on May 28. The celebrations took five days, during which free tours aboard the ships were offered. Firework shows and a seafood cook-off took place, a Blessing of the Ships ceremony closed the activities on June 1. The event was attended by more than 3,000 US servicemen and international partner personnel, and marked the largest assembly of tall ships on the Mississippi river.

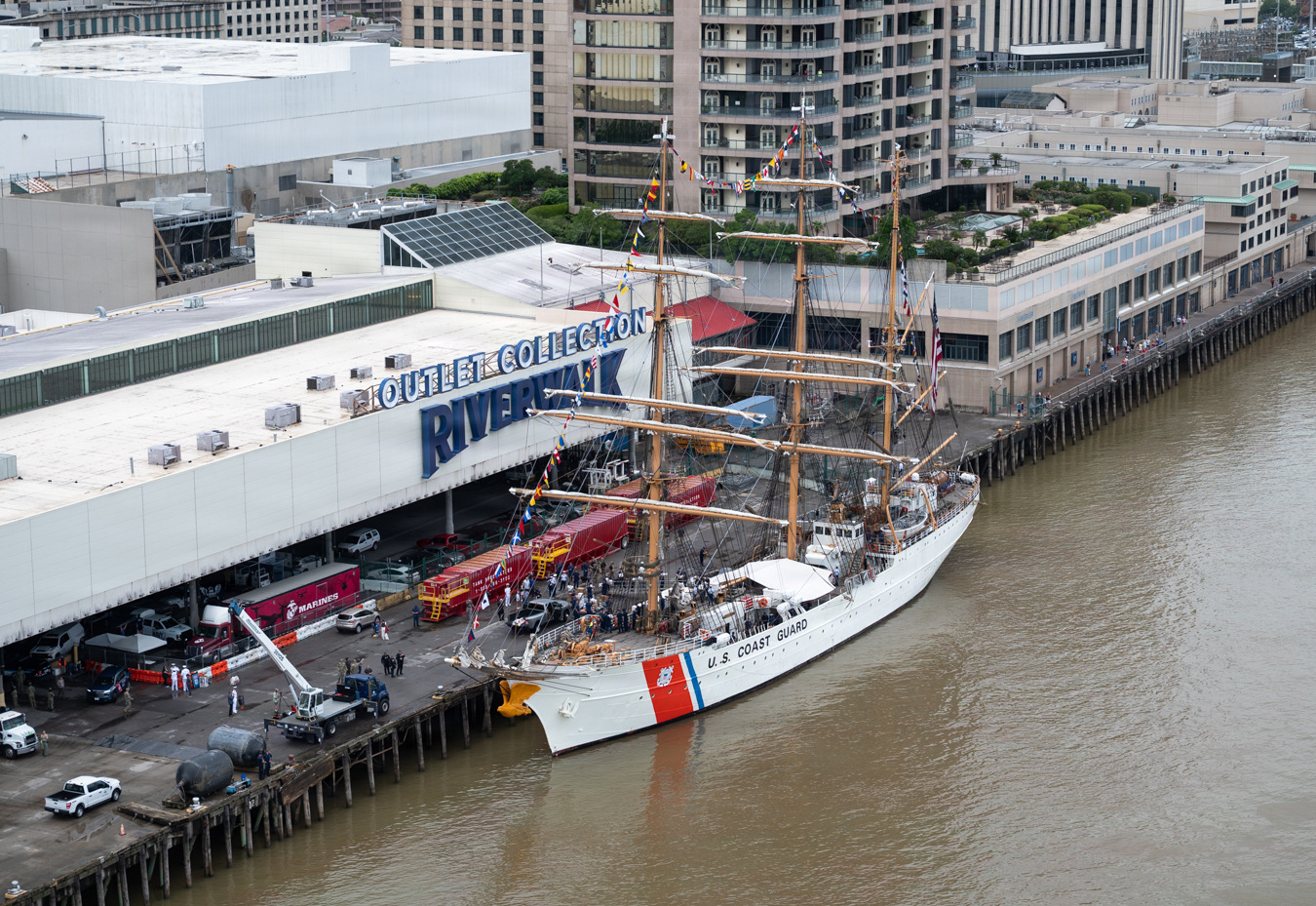
USCGC Eagle docked at New Orleans

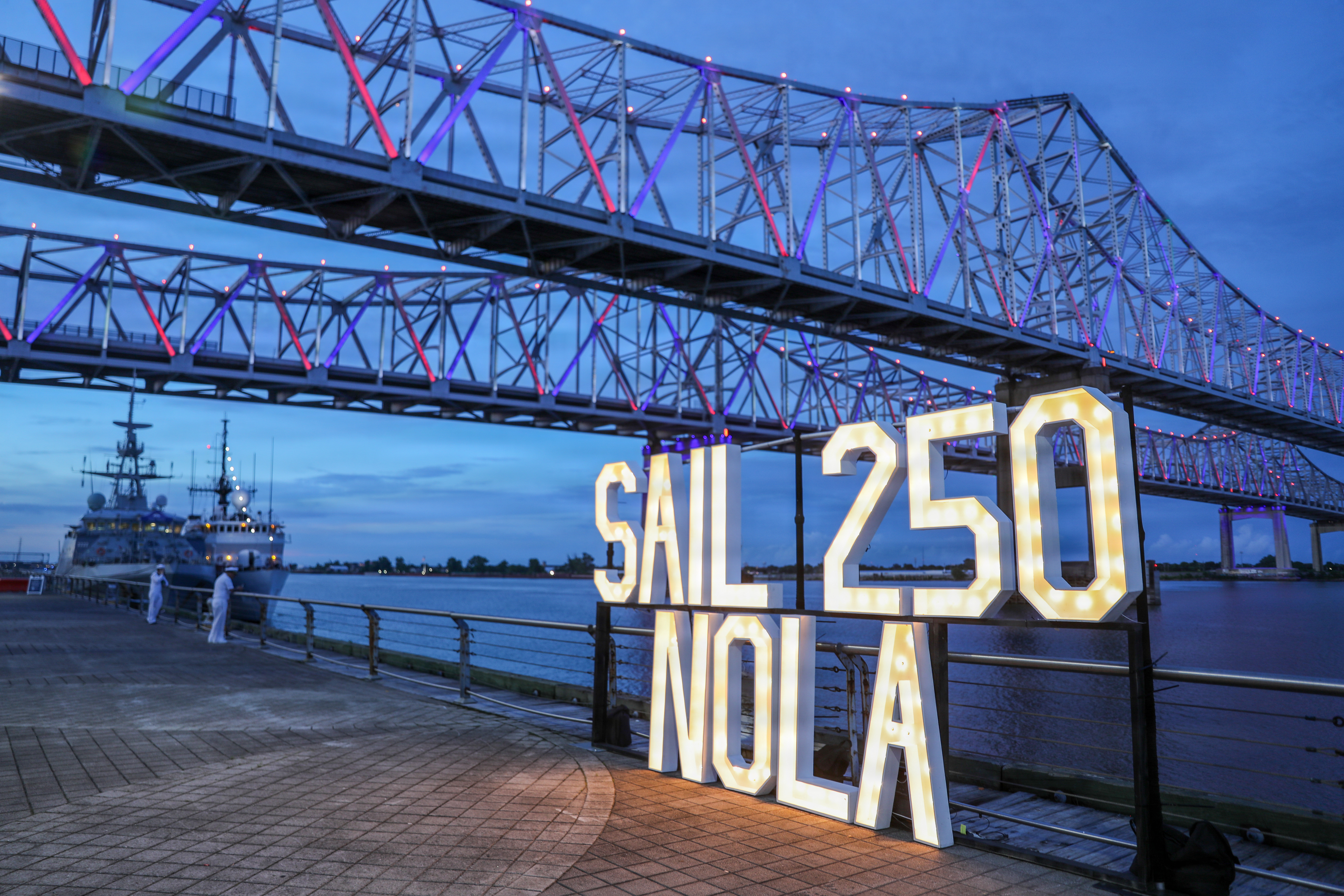
Sail 250 NOLA sign outside the Port of New Orleans headquarters

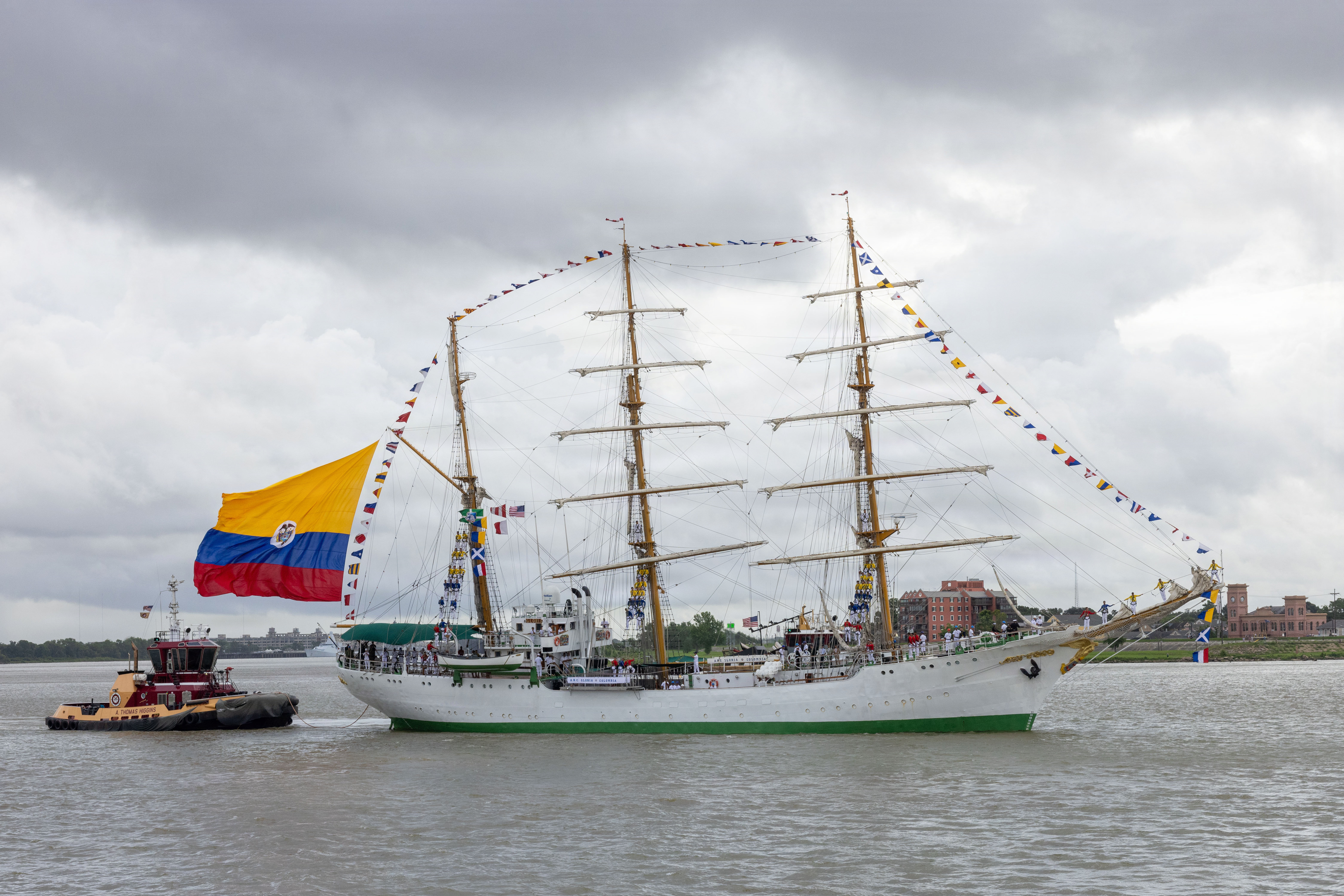
ARC Gloria sailing down the Mississippi river

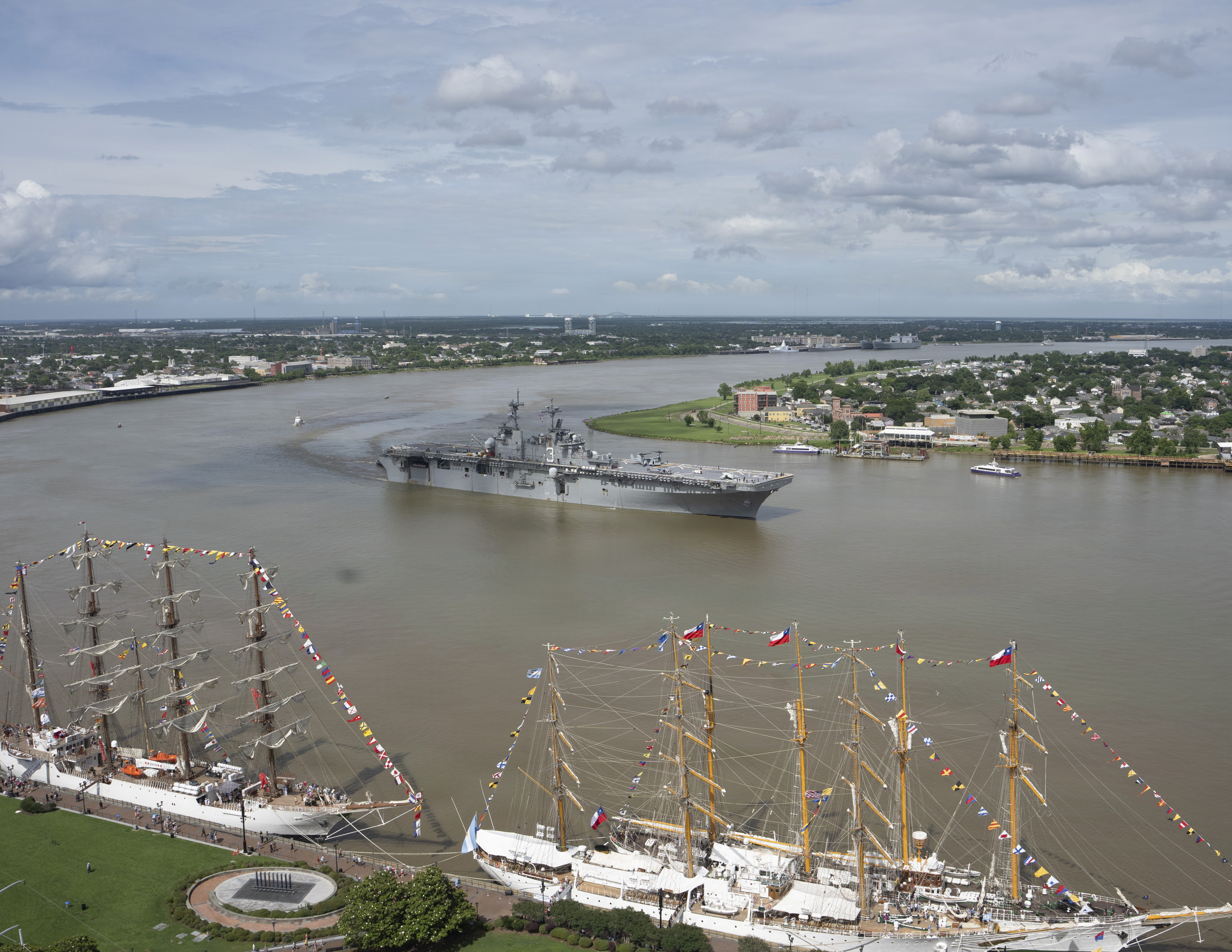
USS Kearsarge arriving in New Orleans

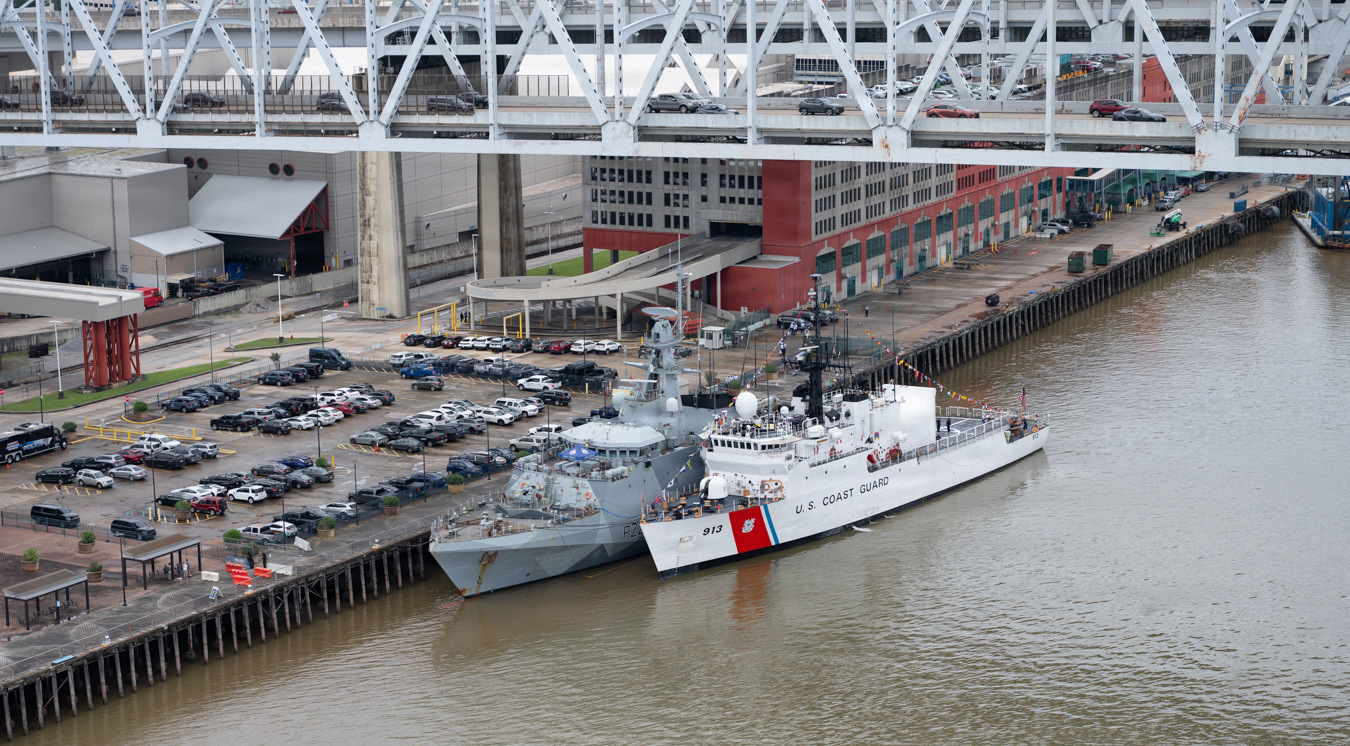
USCGC Mohawk and HMS Trent docked at New Orleans

=== Norfolk (June 12–23) ===
The second event was Sail250 Virginia, organized by Norfolk Festevents, which brought 55 ships from 20 nations with about 10,000 officers, cadets, and crew to Hampton Roads. Affiliate harbors at Cape Charles, Hampton, Smithfield and Yorktown hosted visiting ships from June 12. The main Parade of Sail into downtown Norfolk occurred on June 19, coinciding with Juneteenth and the 50th annual Norfolk Harborfest, and the ships were opened for free tours until the fleet departed on June 23-24.

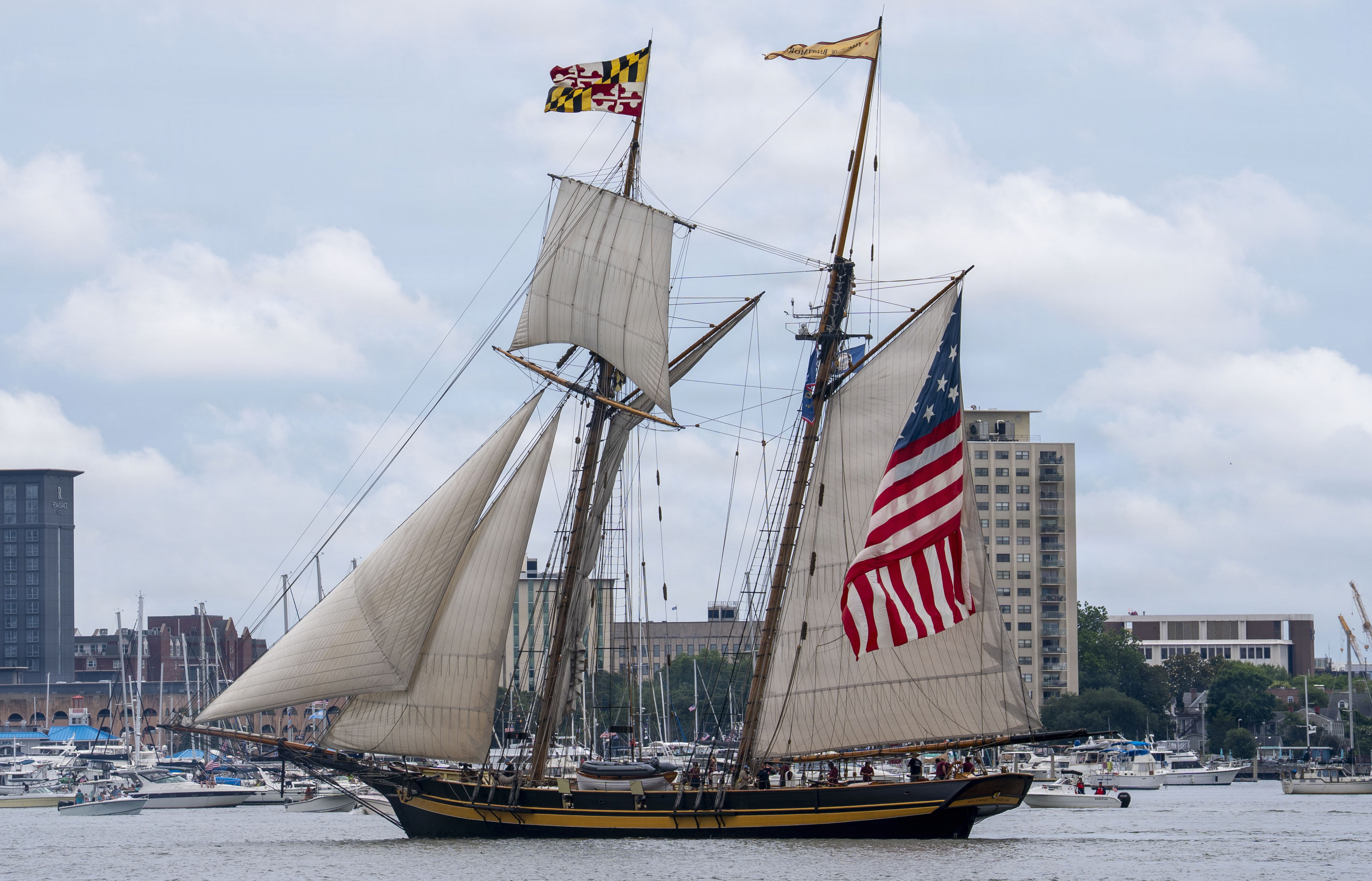
Pride of Baltimore II entering Norfolk harbor

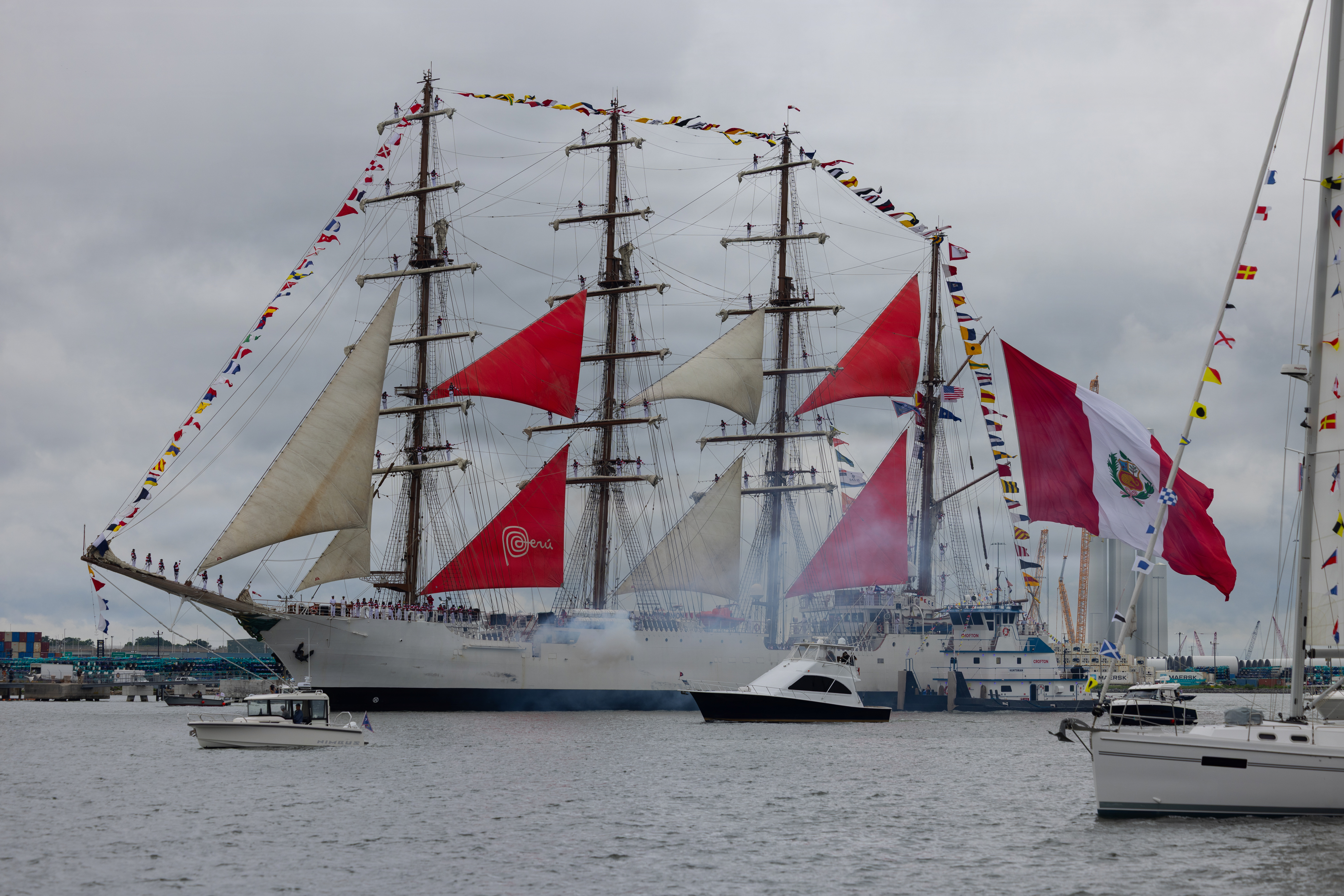
BAP Unión transiting the Elizabeth River during the Parade of Sail

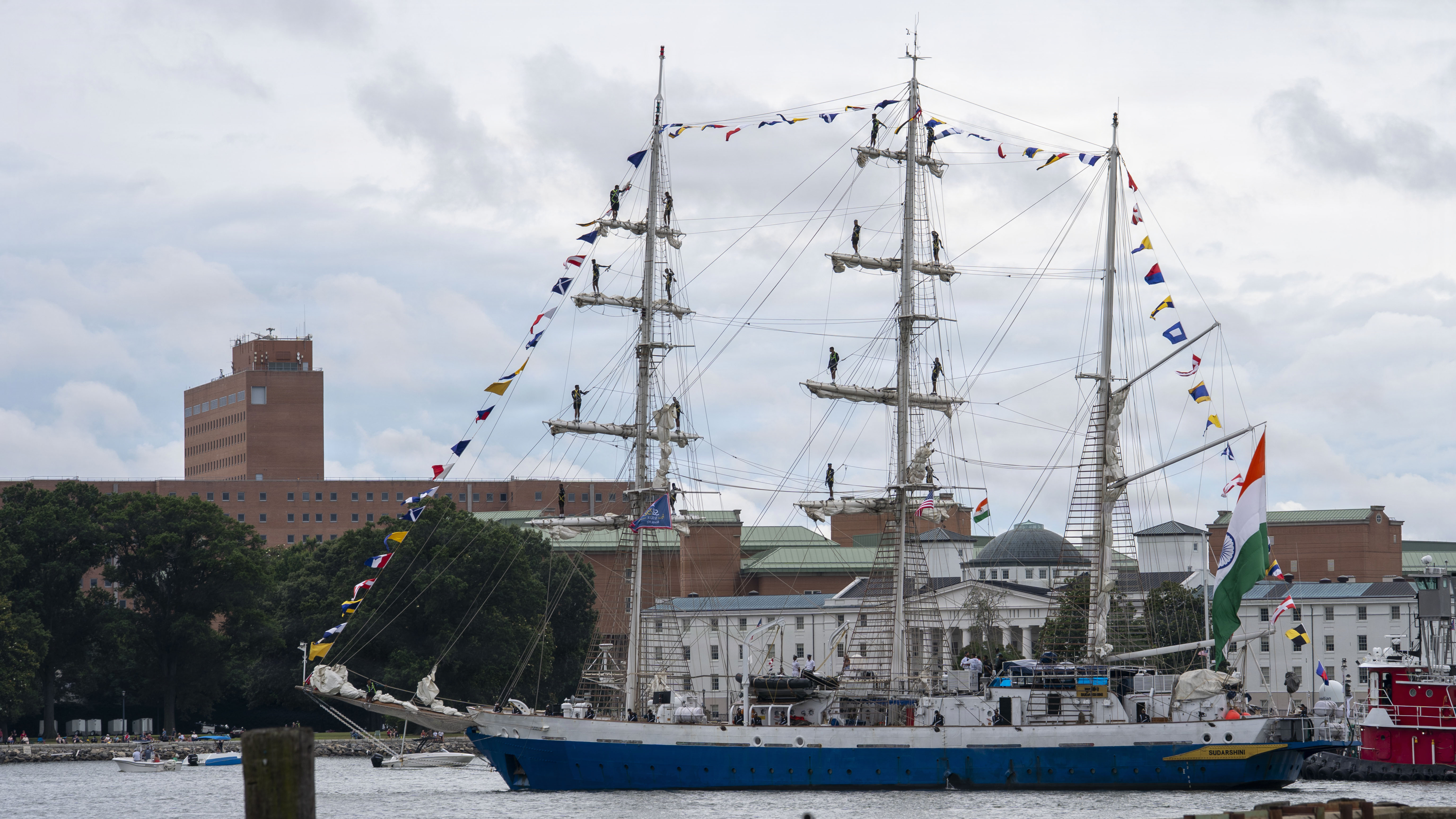
INS Sudarshini arriving in Norfolk

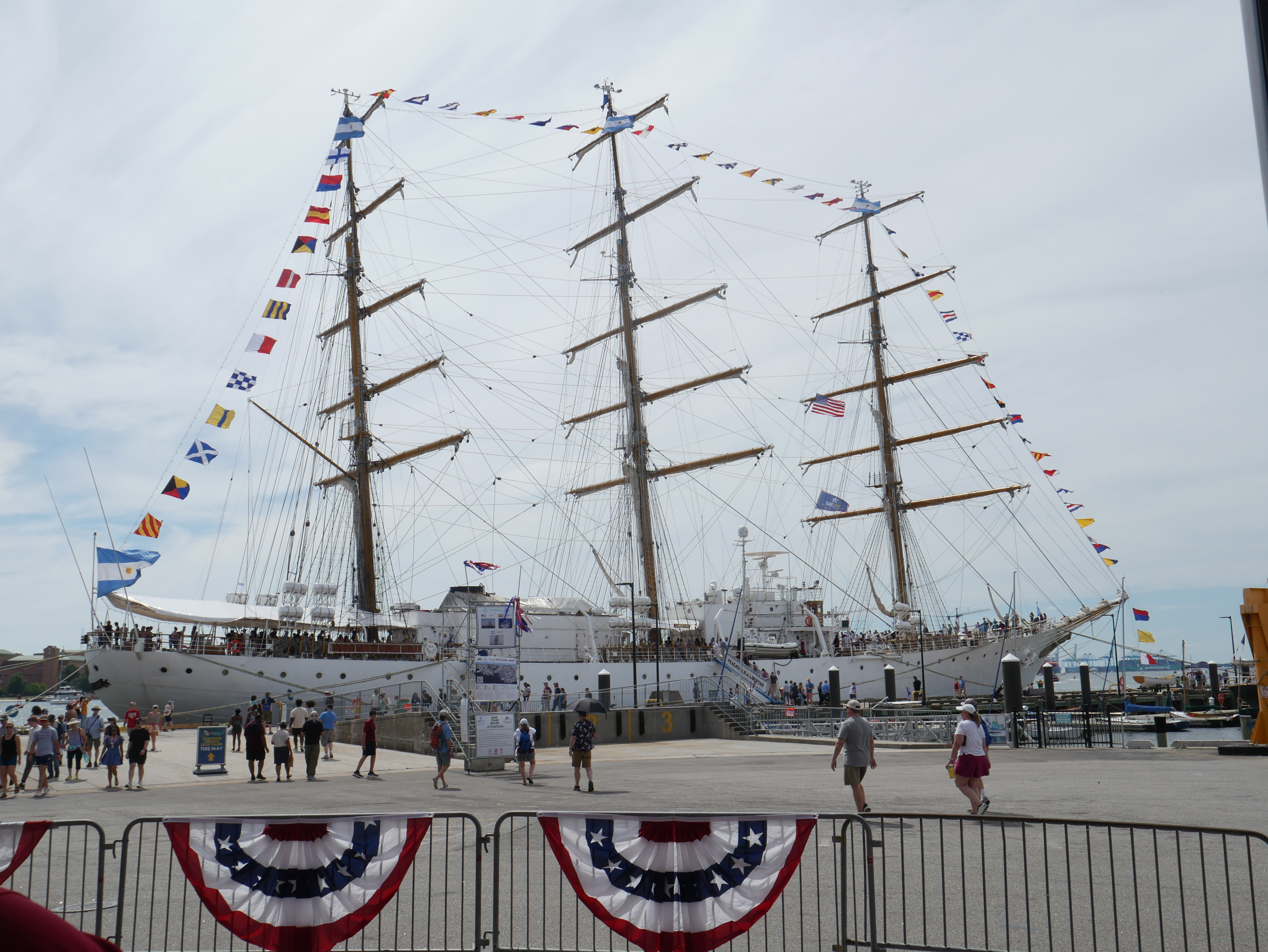
ARA Libertad docked at Norfolk

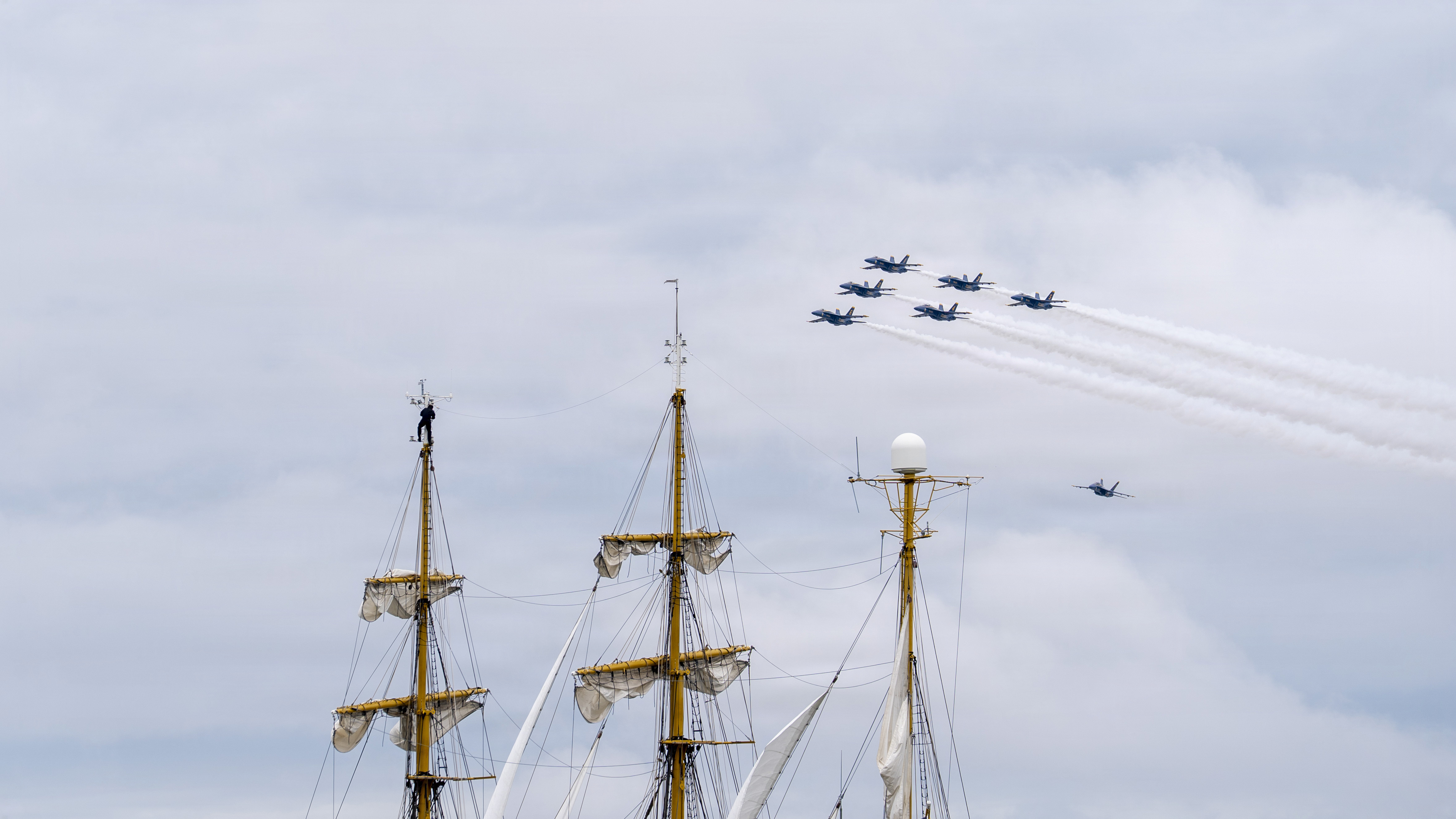
Blue Angels performing a formation flyover during the Sail 250 Virginia Parade of Sails

=== Baltimore (June 24 – July 1) ===
SAIL250 Maryland & Air Show Baltimore, produced by the Living Classrooms Foundation and Historic Ships in Baltimore, combined 14 international tall ships and some 40 vessels overall with the only air show of the Sail250. The Blue Angels, the Red Arrows, the Patrouille de France and the F-16 Viper Demo Team are performed over the harbor, with ships berthed at the Inner Harbor's Harborplace, Fells Point and other locations.

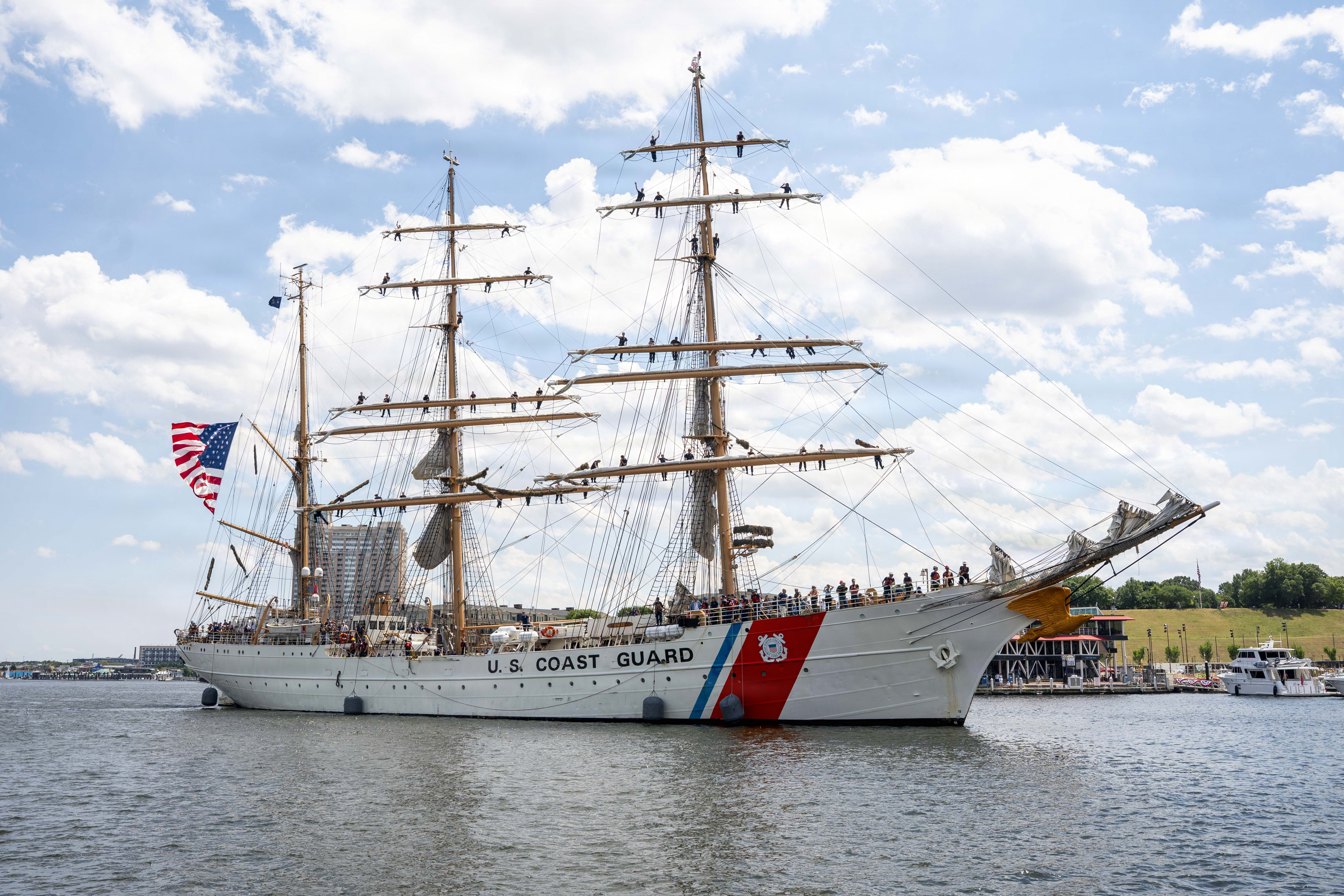
USCGC Eagle entering Baltimore Harbor

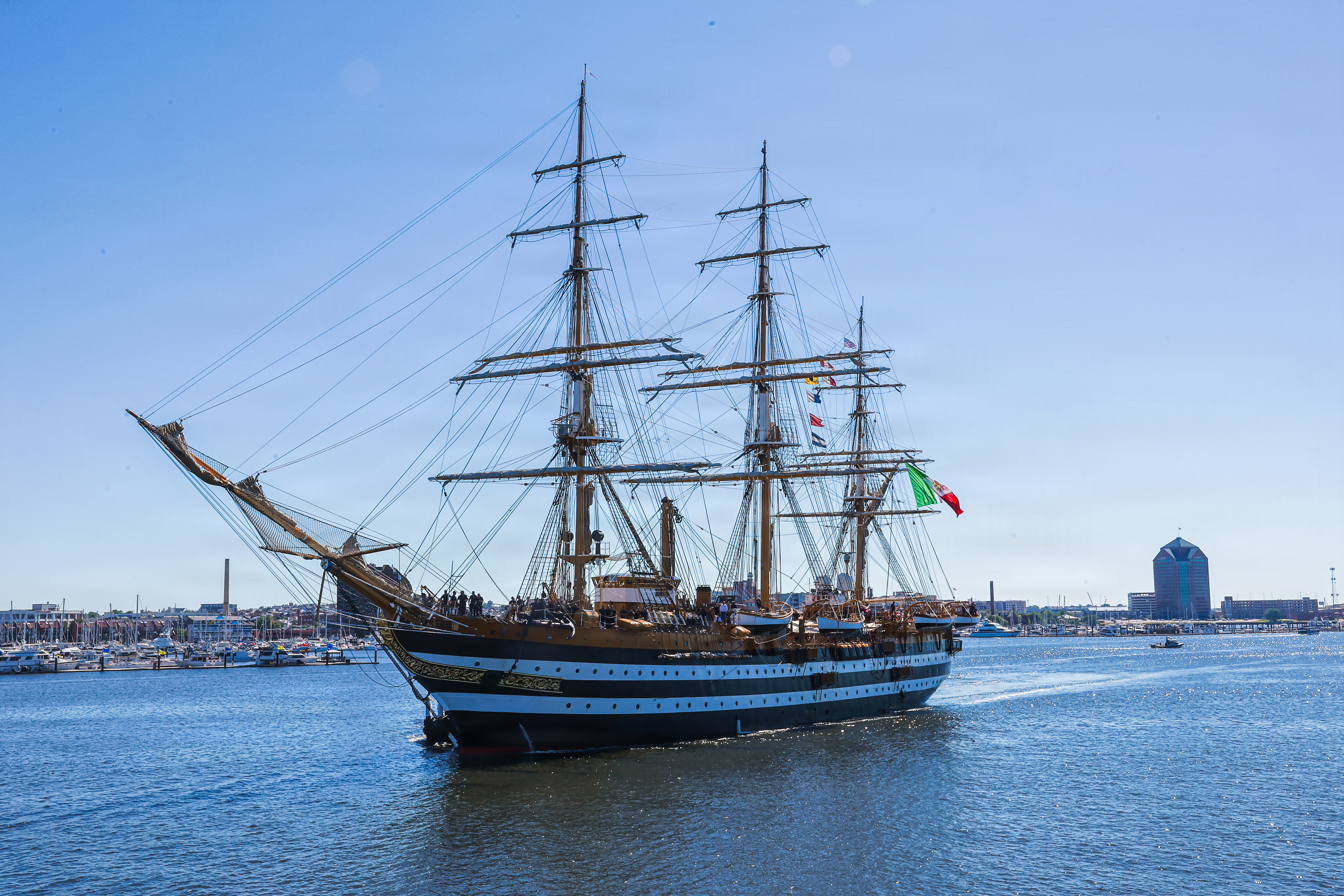
Amerigo Vespucci moors at Tide Point in Baltimore

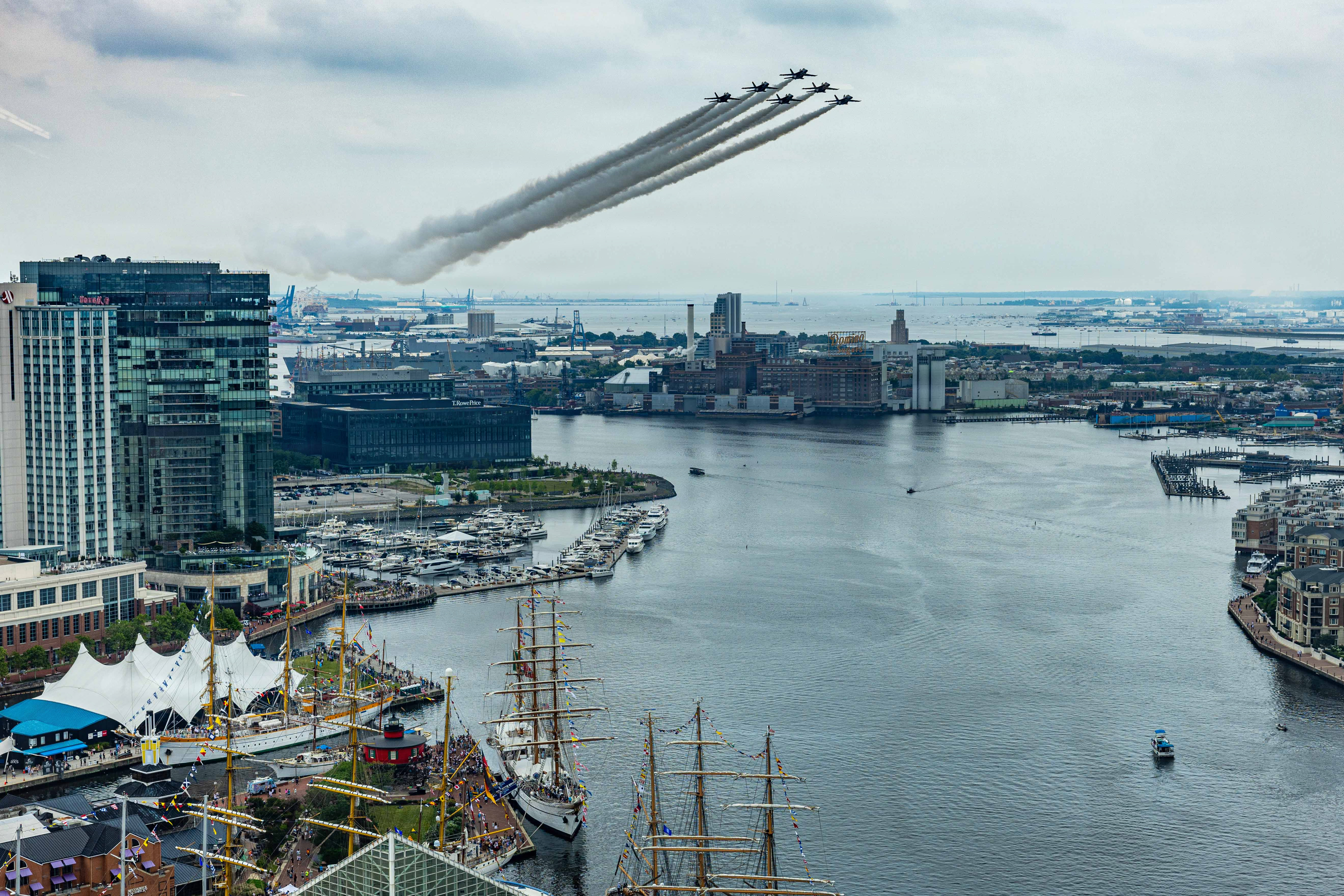
The Blue Angels executing aerial maneuvers over Baltimore harbor

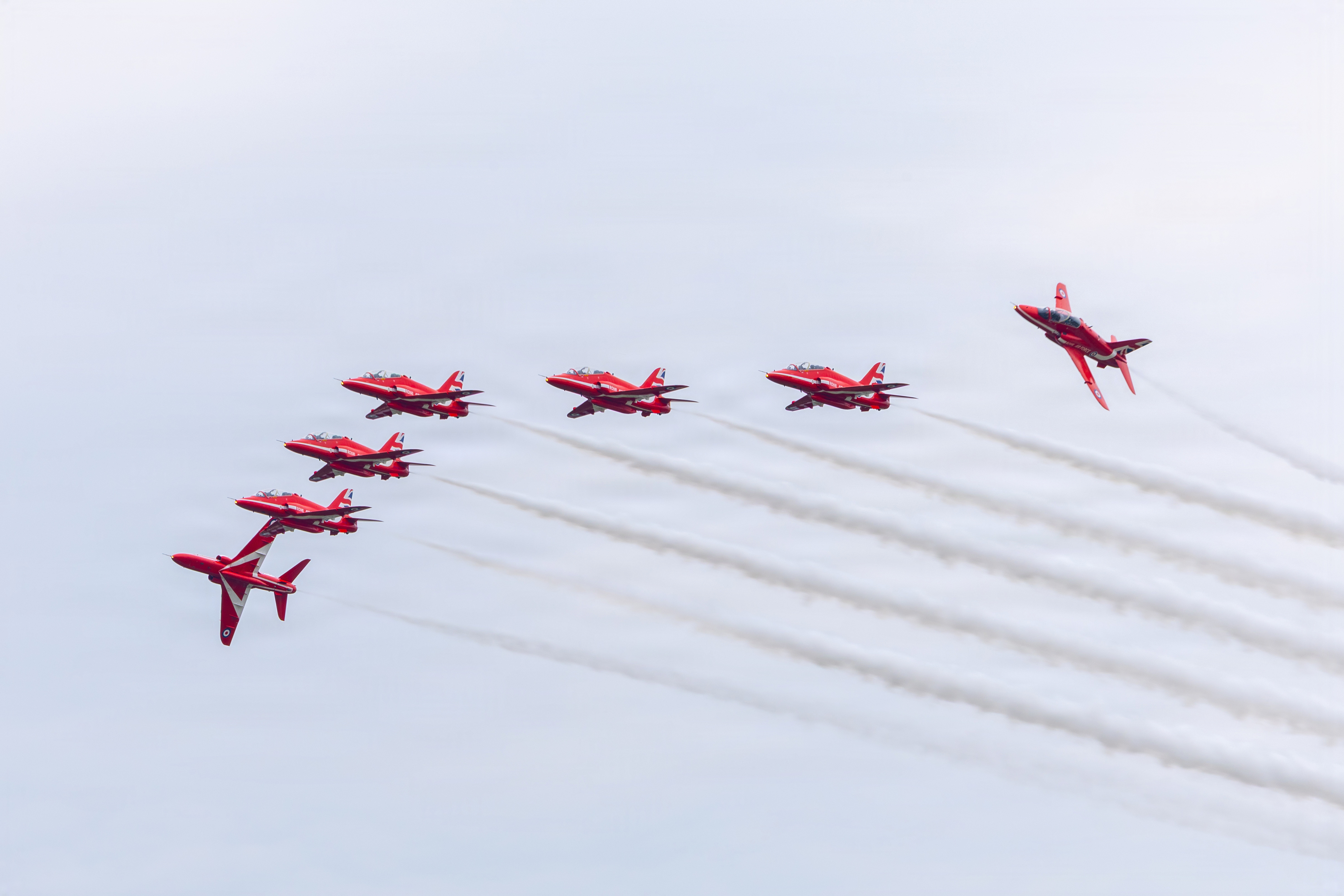
The Red Arrows flying over Martin State Airport during Air Show Baltimore

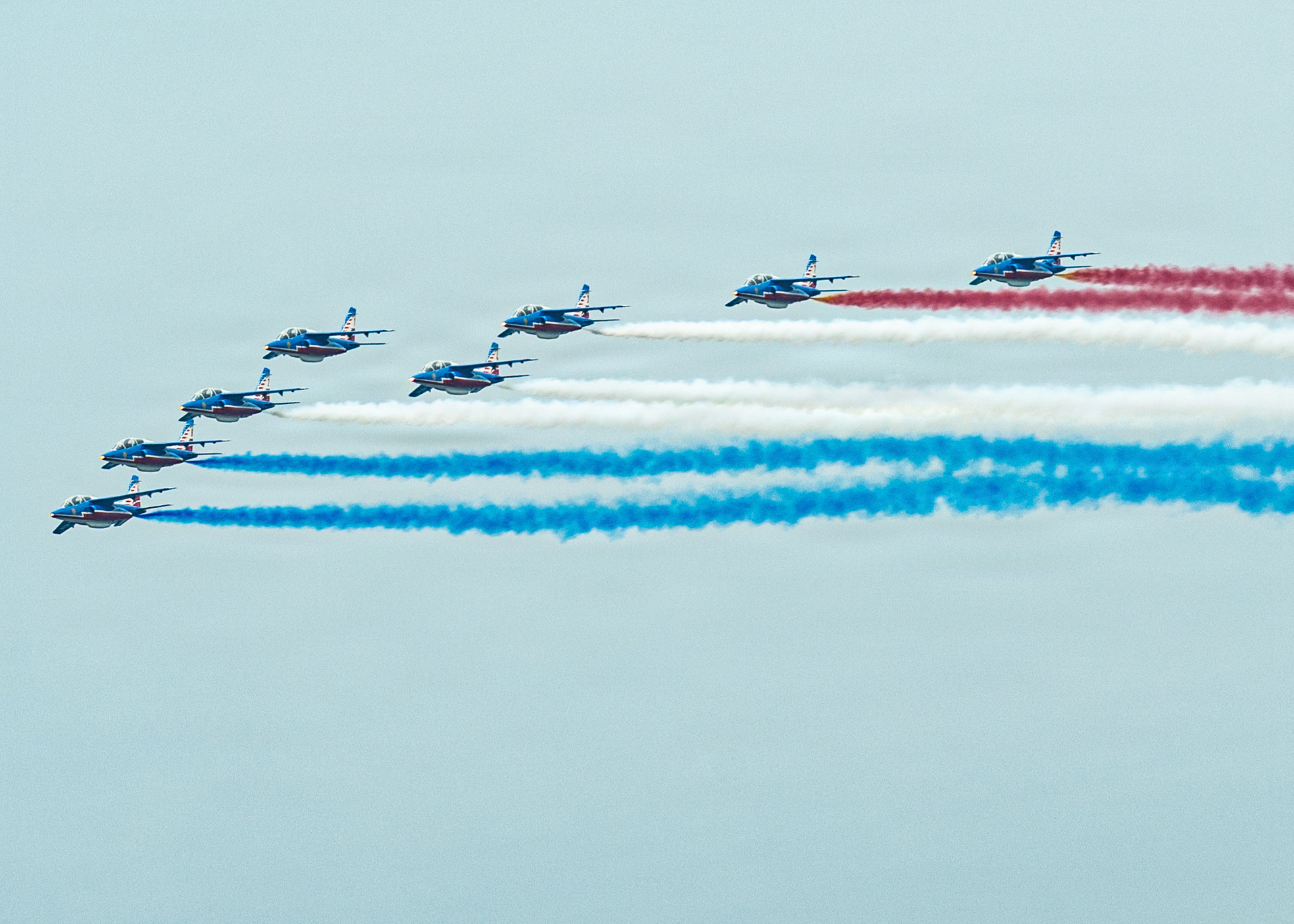
Patrouille de France flying over Baltimore harbor

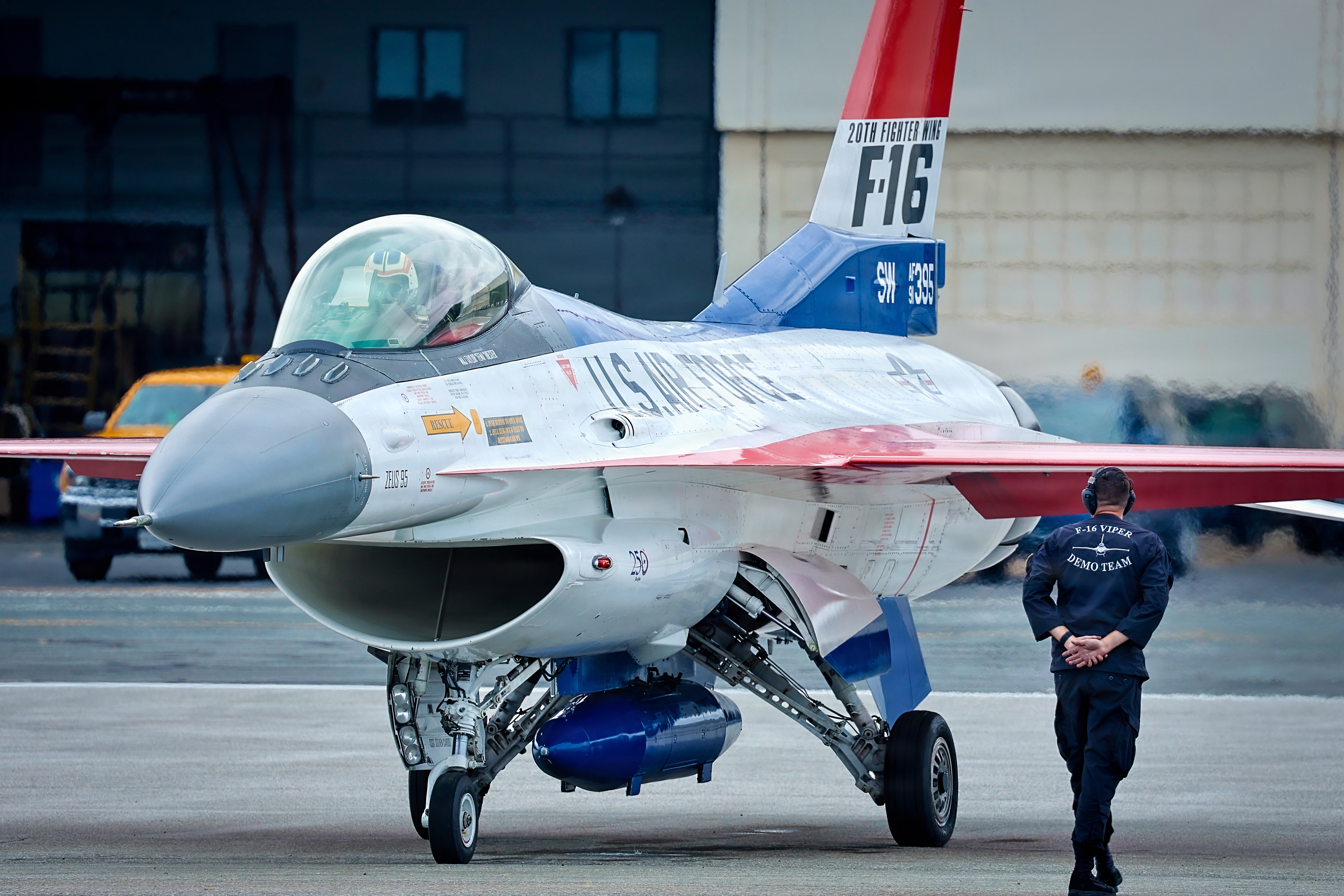
F-16 of the Viper Demo Team taxiing before a demonstration flight

=== New York (July 3–8) ===
The Sail4th 250 program covered the July 4 weekend. Class B tall ships paraded down the East River on July 3; on July 4 the seventh International Naval Review in US history, the first since 2012, was followed by a Parade of Sail in which more than 30 Class A ships, led by USCGC Eagle, sailed from the Verrazzano-Narrows Bridge past the Statue of Liberty up the Hudson River to the George Washington Bridge. Ships were open to the public on July 5–7 at piers in Manhattan, Brooklyn, Staten Island and New Jersey, before several ships departed on a race to Boston for the International Perpetual Challenge Cup.

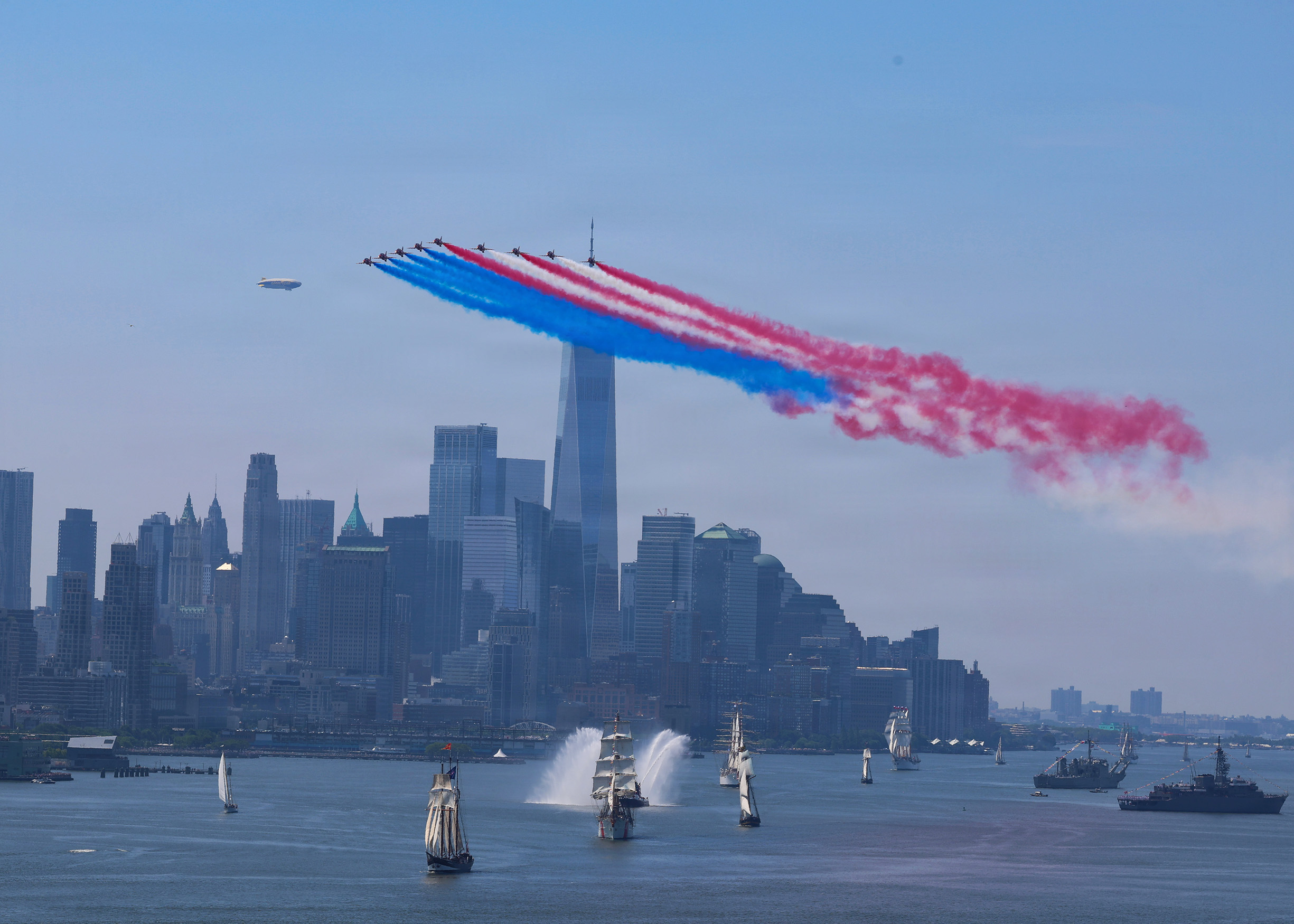
Red Arrows flying with an American flag smoke trail above the Parade of Sail

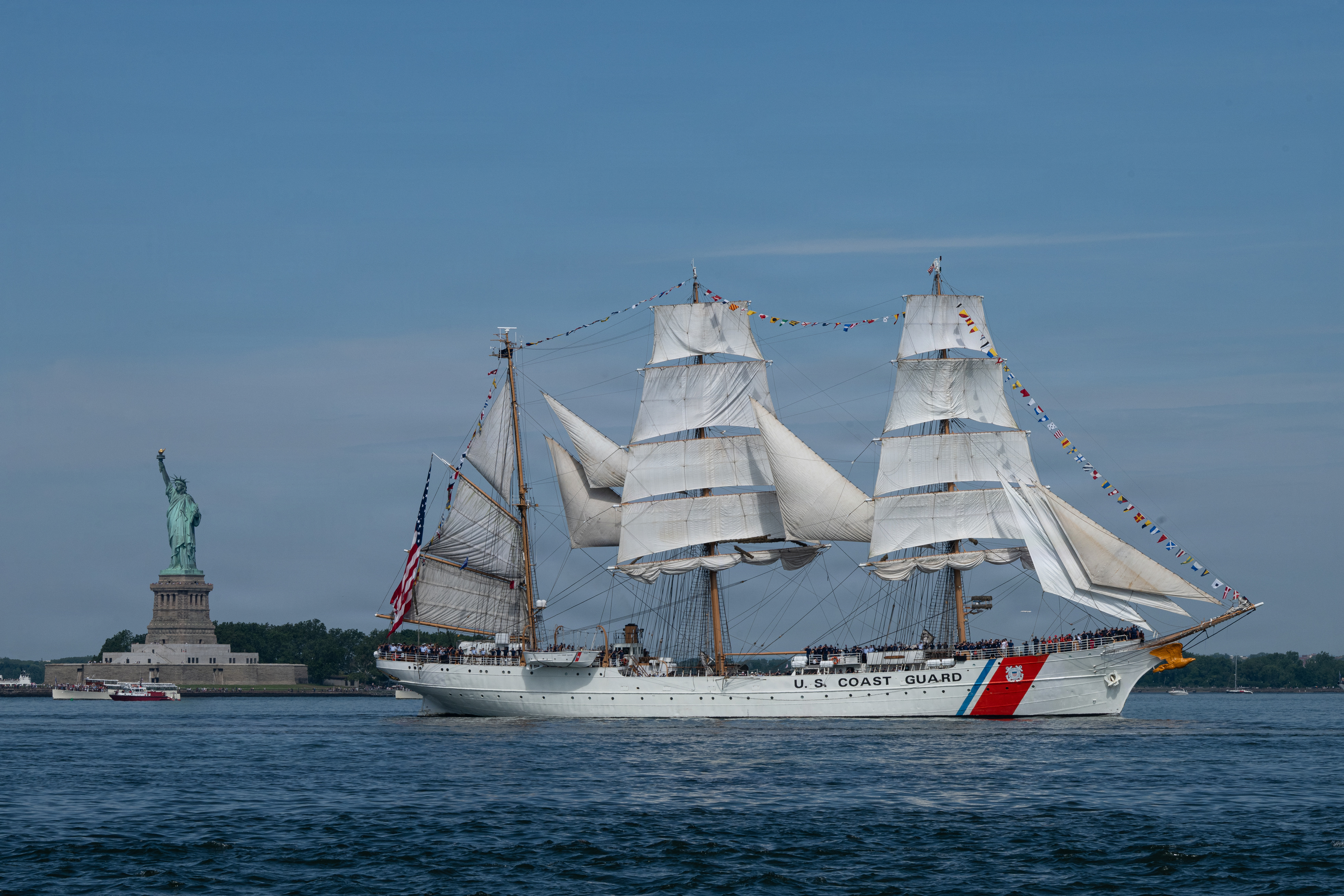
USCGC Eagle sailing past the Statue of Liberty

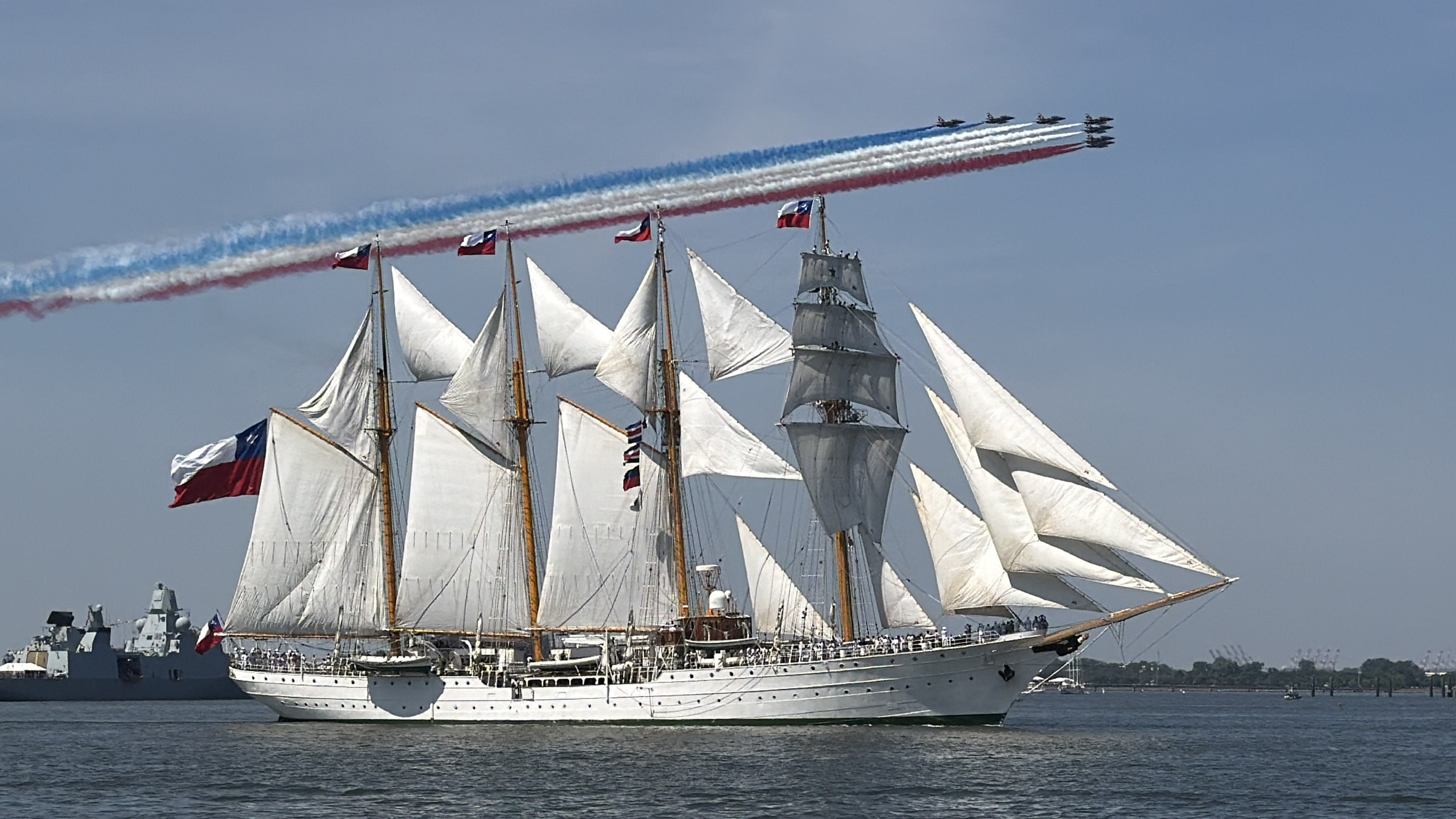
Chilean barquentine Esmeralda sailing into New York City, with the United Arab Emirates Al Fursan in background

An international aerial review also took place overhead, with more than 100 aircraft taking part led by the Blue Angels. Other participants in the aerial review included the Patrouille de France, Canada's Snowbirds, Royal Air Force Aerobatic Team, and Al Fursan from the United Arab Emirates.

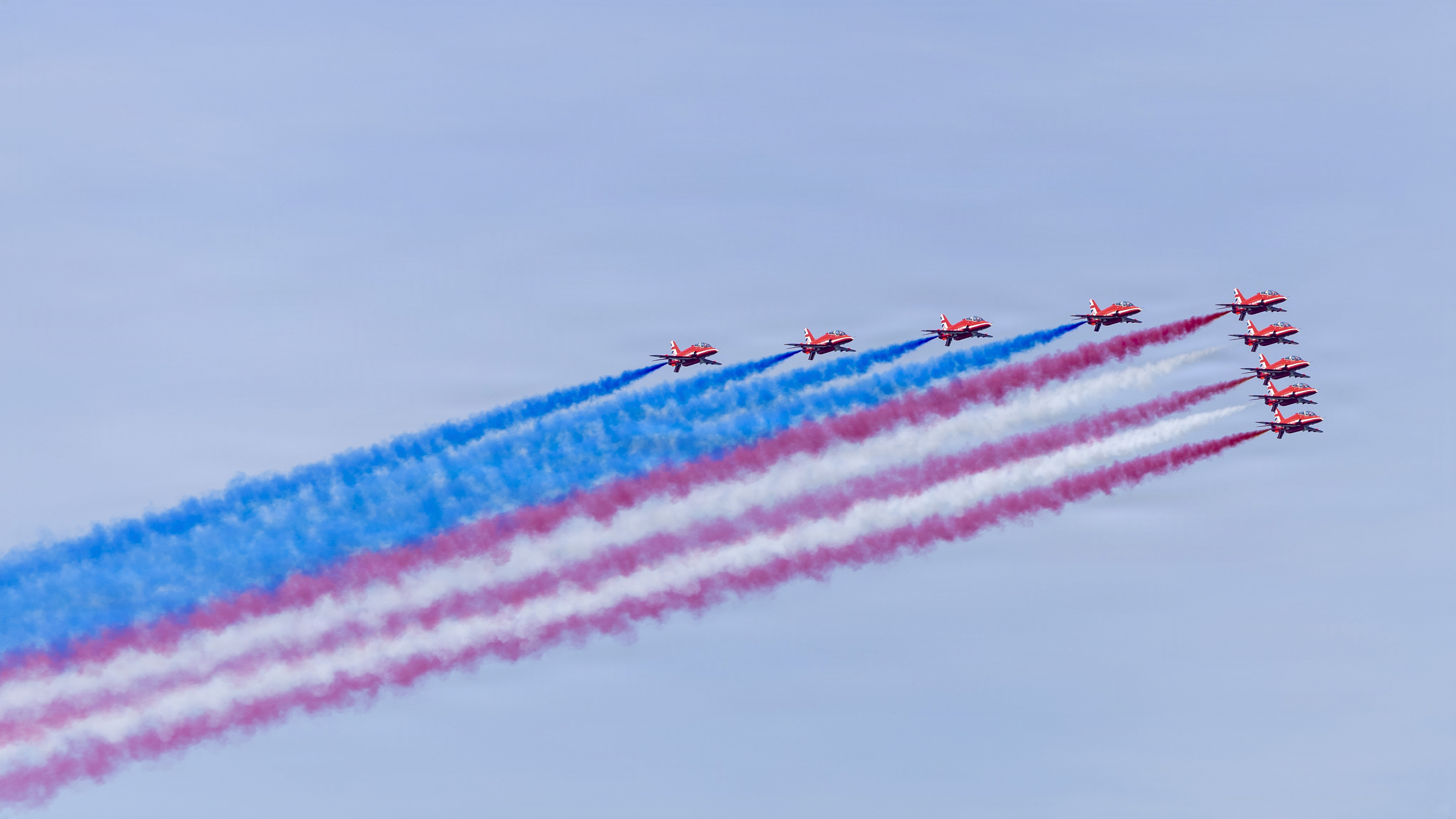
Red Arrows flying over the Hudson River on July 4, 2026

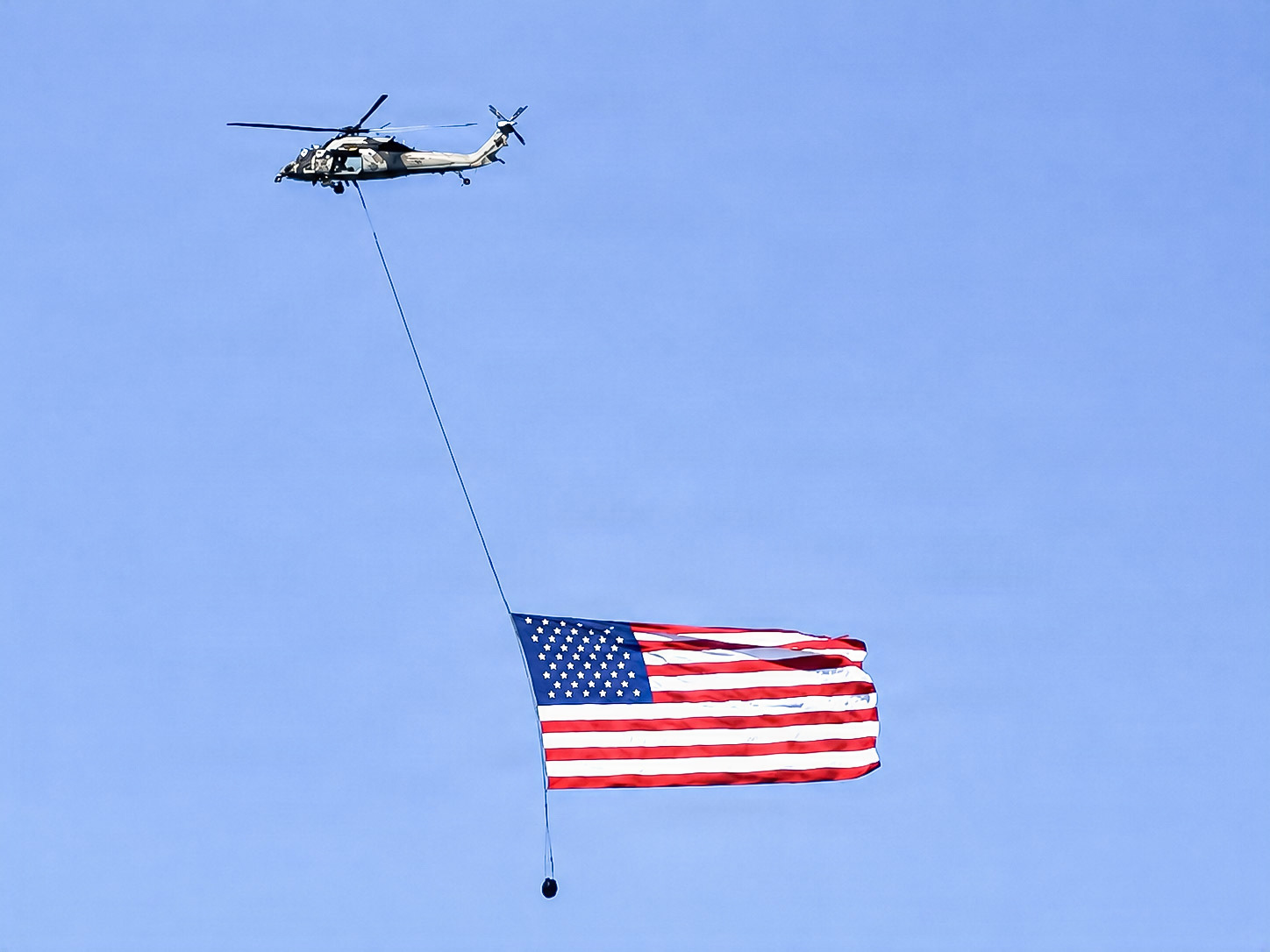
US Navy MH-60S Knighthawk carrying an American flag

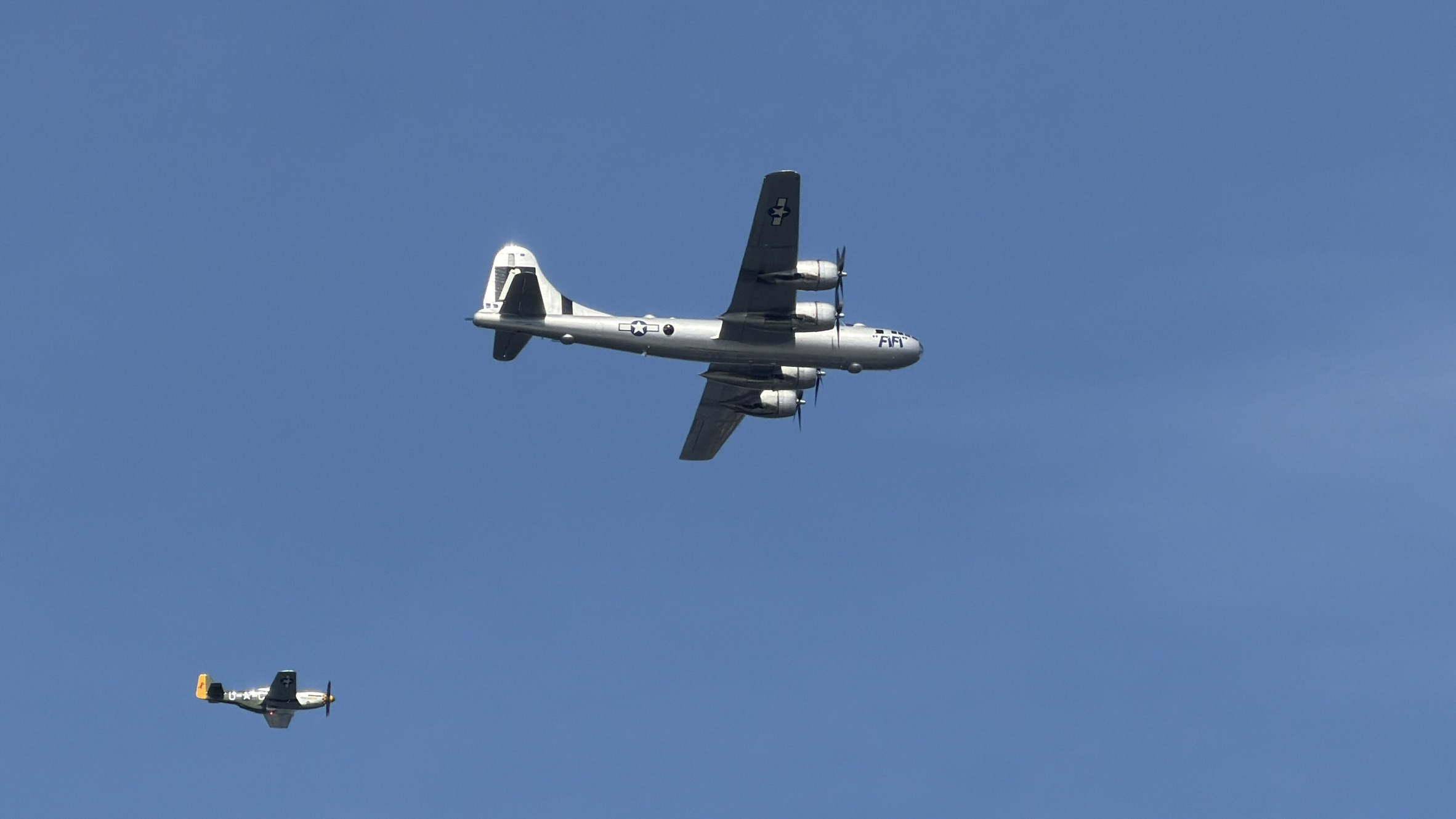
B-29 FIFI and P-51 Gunfighter flying over the Hudson River

The Class A tall ships departed for Boston on July 8. On July 9, the "Five Sisters Cup" tall ship race started, during which the USCGC Eagle and her sister ships raced from New York to Provincetown on their way to Boston. The winner of the race was Gorch Fock, maintaining the trophy she first won in 1976.

=== Boston (July 11–16) ===
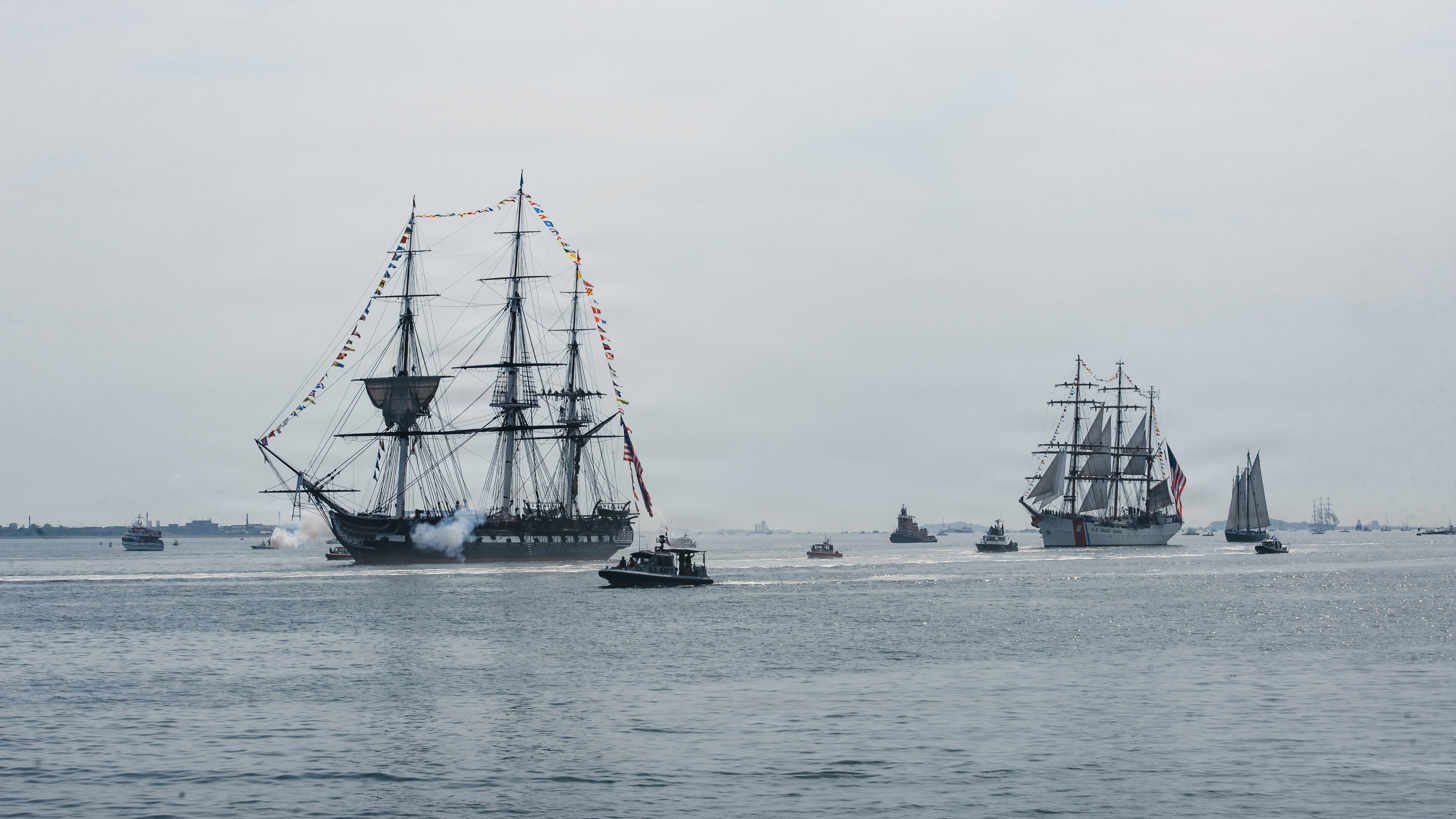
USS Constitution and USCGC Eagle in Boston during Sail250 Boston 2026

Sail Boston 2026, the tour finale, saw the participation of 60 tall ships and military vessels from more than 20 countries, with more than 3 million visitors. The Parade of Sail entered Boston Harbor on July 11, and was followed by free public tours, a crew and cadet street parade and harbor fireworks; the Massachusetts state government committed 4 million dollars for infrastructure and public safety. On July 14, a waterfront festival in Seaport took place, with a "Sail Boston Cup" inspired by the FIFA World Cup organized between Navy ship crews and cadets at LoPresti Park. The five-day event ended on July 16, concluding Sail250. Previous Sail Boston events were held in 1992, 2000, 2009 and 2017.

== See also ==
- Operation Sail
- United States Semiquincentennial
- Tall Ships' Races
