= Vigilante (disambiguation) =

A vigilante is a person who enforces the law without legal authority to do so.

Vigilante may also refer to:

== People ==
- John Vigilante (born 1985), American ice hockey player
- Konni Zilliacus (1894–1967), UK Labour Party politician who used the pen name Vigilantes
- José Estrada Jr., pro-wrestler who used the ringname "El Vigilante"

=== Fictional characters ===
- Vigilante (Arrowverse), a character from the Arrowverse.
- Vigilante (character), several fictional DC Comics characters
- The Vigilante, a boss character from the video game Pizza Tower

=== Groups ===
- The Vigilantes, a syndicate of American writers

== Entertainment ==
- The Vigilante, a 1947 film serial based on the original DC character
- Vigilante (1982 film), a film directed by William Lustig
- Vigilante (1987 film), a Philippine action film
- A Vigilante, a 2018 American film
- Vigilante (TV series), a 2023 South Korean Disney+ webseries

== Albums ==
- Vigilante (Willie Colón and Héctor Lavoe album), or the title song, 1983
- Vigilante (Magnum album), or the title song, 1986

== Military ==
- North American A-5 Vigilante, a US Navy supersonic bomber
- VFA-151, a United States Navy F/A-18E Super Hornet squadron nicknamed the Vigilantes
- T249 Vigilante, a prototype US self-propelled anti-aircraft gun

== Other uses ==
- Vigilante (video game), a 1988 arcade game
- "Vigilante" (Arrow episode), a television episode
- Vigilante (insecticide)
- El Vigilante (sculpture), in Ecatepec, Mexico

== See also ==
- Vigilant (disambiguation)
- Vigilance (disambiguation)
