= Liberty Clipper =

Sailing ship

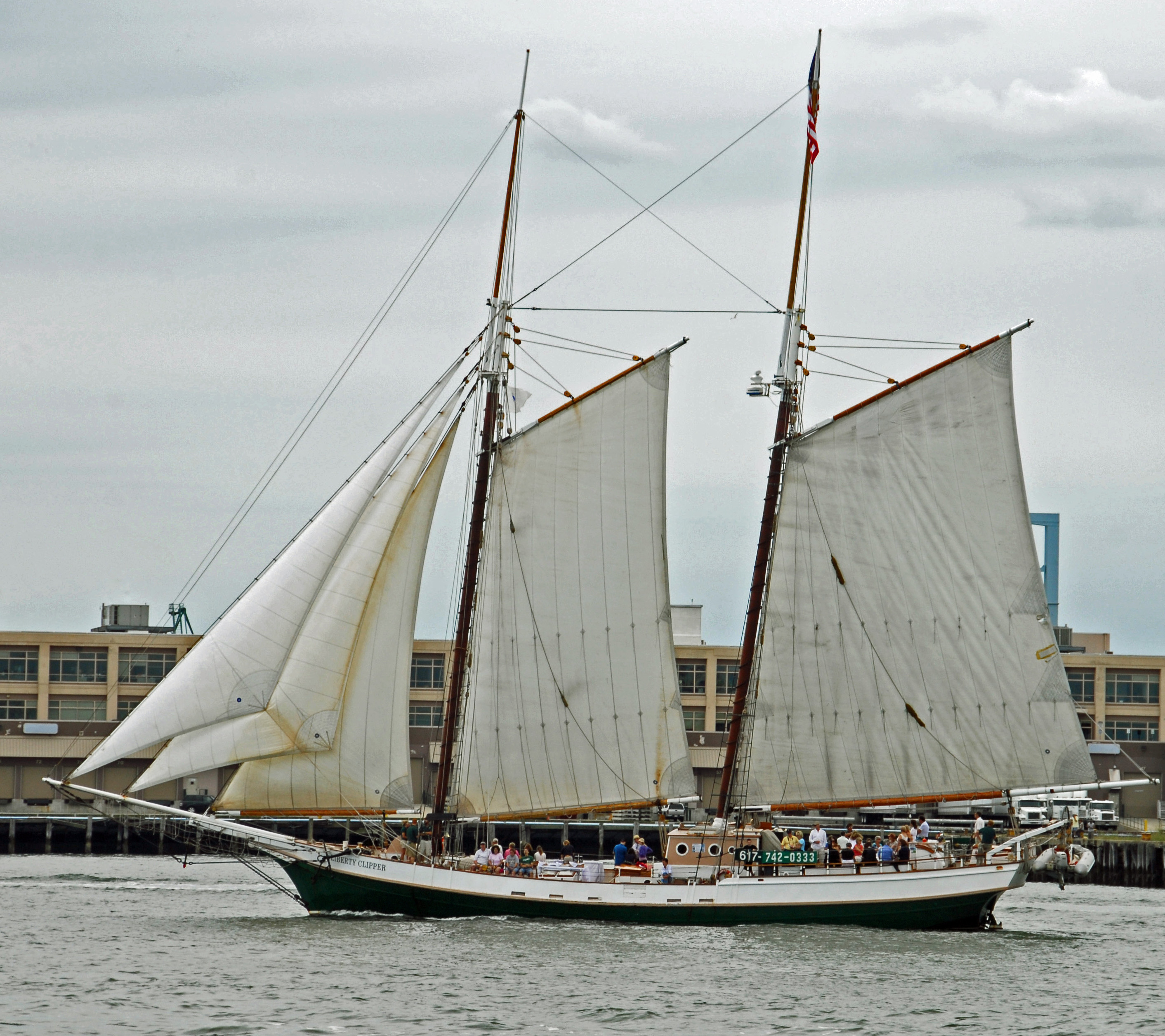

History

United States
- Name: Liberty Clipper
- Builder: Blount Marine
- Commissioned: 1983
- Home port: Port of Boston
- Status: Active

General characteristics
- Class & type: schooner
- Tonnage: 145 tons gross, 99 tons net
- Length: 26.2 m (86 ft) hull, 38.1 m (125 ft) (overall)
- Beam: 8.2 m (27 ft)
- Draught: 2.4 m (7.9 ft) with centreboard up, 3.9 m (13 ft) extended
- Propulsion: sail of 465 m^{2}; auxiliary diesel
- Sail plan: two-masted schooner
- Complement: up to 10 crew and 126 passengers
- Notes: main mast height from the deck is 30.7 m (101 ft)

The Liberty Clipper is a replica sailing ship whose design was inspired by the Baltimore Clipper style of vessels which were predominant along the East Coast in the early 19th century.

She was designed by Charles Wittholz and built in 1983 at the Blount Shipyard in Rhode Island where she was first christened Mystic Clipper. Though built of solid steel, with a 6-71 Detroit diesel motor as auxiliary propulsion, her rig and hull shape remain traditional. She is currently operated as a charter vessel and sails out of Port Jefferson, NY.
