= Vigilance =

Vigilance may refer to:

- Alertness
- Vigilance, a creature ability in the Magic: The Gathering collectible card game
- Vigilance (album), by Threat Signal
- Vigilance (behavioural ecology), the watchfulness of prey for nearby predators
- Vigilance (psychology), the ability to maintain attention and alertness over prolonged periods of time
- Vigilance (video game), a 1998 PC game by SegaSoft
- Vigilance (novel), a 2019 novel by Robert Jackson Bennett
- Vigilance committee, a group of private citizens formed to administer law
- Vigilance committee (trade union)
- Vigilance control, on railways

== Airship ==
- ZPG-3W Vigilance, largest US Navy non-rigid airship ever built

== Ship ==
- USS Vigilance (AM-324), a US Navy minesweeper
- Vigilance (fireboat), a fireboat operated by the city of Long Beach, California
- BNS Vigilance, a patrol boat of the Biafran navy

== See also ==
- Hypervigilance
- Vigilant (disambiguation)
- Vigilante (disambiguation)
