= Baltimore Clipper =

Type of fast sailing vessel

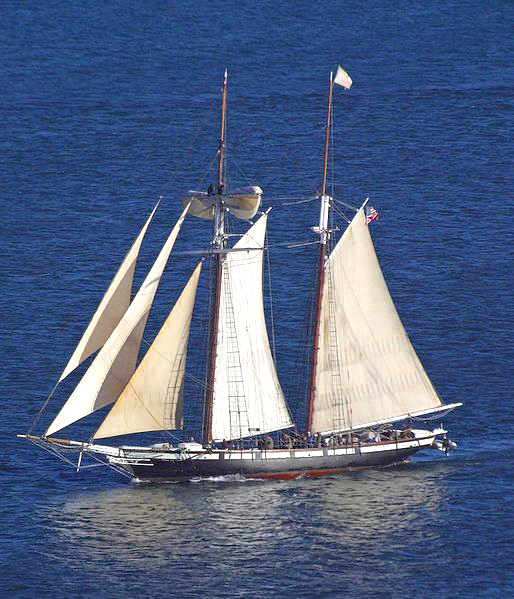
Replica of 1847 "Baltimore Clipper" Californian built in 1984

A Baltimore clipper is a fast sailing ship historically built on the mid-Atlantic seaboard of the United States, especially at the port of Baltimore, Maryland. An early form of clipper, the name is most commonly applied to two-masted schooners and brigantines. These vessels may also be referred to as Baltimore Flyers.

The design flaws of the Baltimore clippers did not affect their popularity. The biggest cause of their decline was public backlash to their functions, such as illegally importing slaves after the Act Prohibiting Importation of Slaves in 1807 and raiding in South America.

== History ==
Baltimore clippers were built as small, fast sailing vessels for trade around the coastlines of the United States and with the Caribbean Islands. Their hull lines tended to be very sharp, with a V-shaped cross section below the waterline and strongly raked stem, stern posts, and masts. The origins of the type are unknown, but certainly hulls conforming to the concept were being built in Jamaica and Bermuda, with the hull of the ocean-going Bermuda sloop broader than the Jamaican and deeper than the American design. By the late 18th century, the Baltimore configuration was not only popular in the United States as merchant craft, but also in Britain.

The National Maritime Museum, Greenwich, has a one-page drawing labeled "A DRAWING OF HIS MAJESTY'S ARM'D SCHOONER BERBICE, THE 5TH AUG 1789" that comprises a sheer plan, body lines, deck plan, lines, and a view of her stern. These drawings of HMS Berbice represent the earliest draught of what became known as the Baltimore clipper.

The Royal Navy found the schooners of only limited usefulness during the French Revolutionary Wars and Napoleonic Wars because they were unstable gun platforms due to their design for extreme speed compared to their size. Furthermore, the schooner rig does not allow sails to be backed, creating a disadvantage in maneuverability in battle. They were adopted after the wars to pursue slave ships.

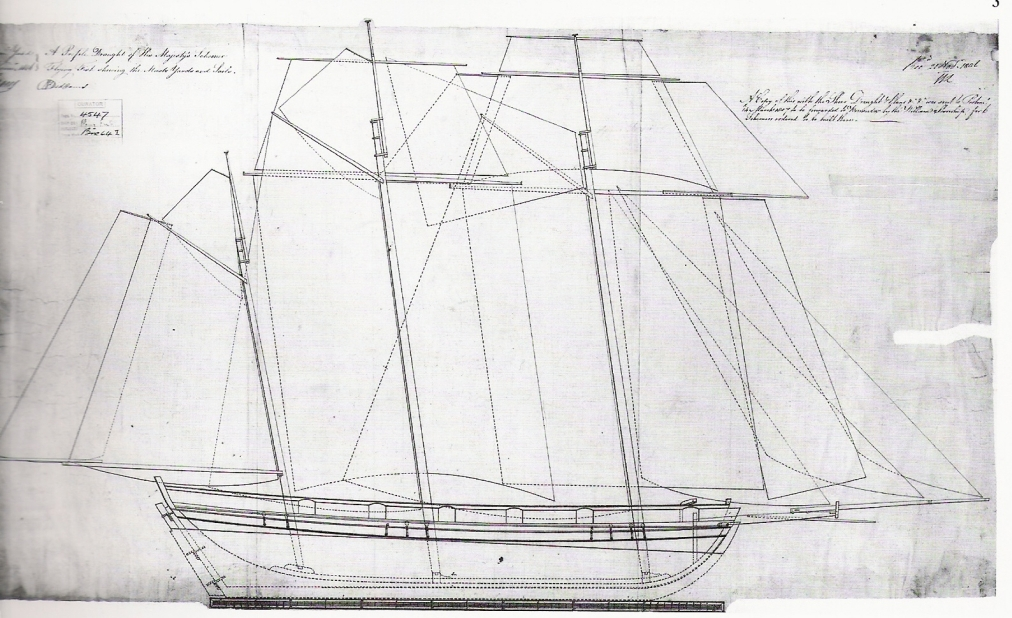
Drawing for the Flying Fish class, modeled on an American vessel, was sent to Bermudian builders by the Admiralty.

They were especially suited to moving low-density, high value perishable cargoes such as slaves, and in that trade operated as far afield as the west coast of Africa.

Similar merchant vessels were given letters of marque and served as privateers during the War of Independence. During the War of 1812, merchant schooners were too small and slow to escape the British blockade, and larger, faster, more heavily armed, purpose-built privateer Baltimore clippers were developed. The most famous of these larger vessels were the privateers Chasseur, Prince de Neufchatel, and General Armstrong. Prince de Neufchatel resisted an attack by a fourfold numerically superior force in the ships of HMS Endymion and Chasseur alone captured more enemy ships than the entire US Navy during the war. Nevertheless, most privateers during the war were of the smaller type and served as merchant ships despite being given letters of marque. As a result, more privateers were taken by the British blockade of 1813 than ever took a prize themselves.

While the Baltimore clipper's design had flaws, the biggest cause of its decline was public backlash to their functions, such as illegally importing slaves after the Act Prohibiting Importation of Slaves in 1807 and raiding in South America.

One particularly famous Baltimore clipper, and one of the last of the type in commercial service, was the schooner Vigilant that traded around the Danish Caribbean islands for over a century before sinking in a hurricane on September 12, 1928. She was believed to have been built in the 1790s.

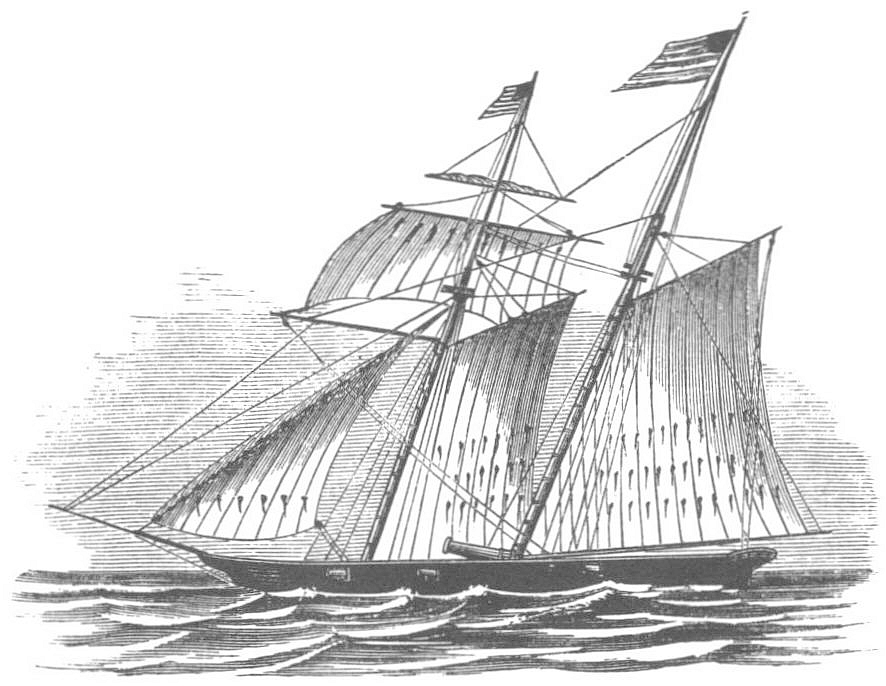
An original Baltimore clipper: These were used as privateers during the War of 1812.

== Famous Baltimore clippers ==
- Vigilant, 1794, one of the first and most famous Baltimore clippers. She sailed for over 130 years, bringing mail and passengers to ports in the Danish West Indies and around the Virgin Islands.
- Chasseur was built in 1812 by Thomas Kemp and commanded by Captain Thomas Boyle, an American privateer during the War of 1812.
- Lynx was built by Thomas Kemp in 1812, also for the War of 1812.
- HMS Black Joke, a captured slave ship, ended up freeing several hundred slaves in service of the West Africa Squadron.

== In popular culture ==
Capt. Jack Aubrey uses a captured Baltimore clipper, the Ringle, as his tender in the Patrick O'Brian novels The Commodore and The Yellow Admiral. The ship is named after the American writer who brought the clippers to O'Brian's attention.

== Modern replicas ==
Modern replicas of an early 19th-century Baltimore clipper type include the Pride of Baltimore (1977) and her replacement Pride of Baltimore II (1988), Californian (1984), La Amistad (2000), Shenandoah (1964), the Liberty Clipper (1983), and the Lynx (2001).
