= HMRC Vigilant =

A number of vessels of the British revenue services, at times known as the Inland Revenue, HM Customs and Excise, HM Revenue and Customs, and most recently UK Border Agency, have been named Vigilant:^{[a]}

- HMRC Vigilant (1901) was a customs cutter built in 1901 and converted into a houseboat in 1920. She is currently laid up awaiting preservation.
- HMRC Vigilant (1921) was the former HMS Esther, acquired in 1921 and the sole Revenue vessel during the 1920s.
- HMRC Vigilant (1947) was the former HMS Benbecula, acquired in 1947.
- HMC Vigilant is a customs cutter built in 2003, and in service as of 2009 (previously HMRC Vigilant, and HMCC Vigilant).

== Notes ==
The Inland Revenue and HM Customs and Excise Departments merged to form HM Revenue and Customs on 18 April 2005, and from this time customs cutters changed their prefix from "HMRC" (Her Majesty's Revenue Cutter) to "HMCC" (Her Majesty's Customs Cutter). Following transfer to the UK Border Agency this was shortened to the current HMC (Her Majesty's Cutter).
