= USCGC Vigilant =

USCGC Vigilant may refer to:

- USCGC Vigilant (WPC-154), was commissioned in 1927 and decommissioned in 1966
- USCGC Vigilant (WMEC-617), is a Reliance-class cutter commissioned in 1964 and currently in service

See also

- USRC Vigilant for ships of the US Revenue Cutter Service
- USS Vigilant for ships of the US Navy

Note

- Ships of the US Revenue Cutter Service and the US Coast Guard were often placed under the authority of the US Navy during times of war.
