= USRC Vigilant =

USRC Vigilant may refer to various ships of the United States Revenue-Marine (1790–1894) and United States Revenue Cutter Service (1894–1915):

- USRC Vigilant (1791), the first cutter in the Revenue Marine, in service from 1791 to 1798
- USRC Vigilant (1797), a cutter in service from 1797 to 1812
- USRC Vigilant (1812), a schooner in commission from 1812 to 1842
- USRC Vigilant (1843), in service from 1843 until destroyed in a hurricane in 1844
- USRC Vigilant (1856), in service from 1856 to 1866
- USRC Vigilant (1876), a schooner placed in service in 1876
- USRC Vigilant (1910), in service in the Revenue Cutter Service from 1910 to 1915 and in the United States Coast Guard from 1915 to 1940

== See also ==
- USS Vigilant for ships of the United States Navy
- USCGC Vigilant for ships of the United States Coast Guard (1915–present)

== Notes ==
- Ships of the United States Revenue-Marine, United States Revenue Cutter Service, and United States Coast Guard were often placed under the authority of the United States Navy during times of war.
