= Luther Blount =

American businessman

Luther Hammond Blount
- Born: September 5, 1916; Warren, Rhode Island, United States
- Died: September 24, 2006 (aged 90)
- Education: Wentworth Institute of Technology
- Occupations: Shipbuilder and inventor

Luther H. Blount (September 5, 1916 – September 24, 2006) was an American entrepreneur, inventor, and philanthropist. Blount was a shipbuilder and holds 22 patents, most of which are relating to his trade.

== Biography ==
Luther Blount was born on September 5, 1916, in Warren, Rhode Island, to Willis Eugene Blount and Ruth Gibbs Blount. Luther had one brother F. Nelson Blount, the industrialist and steam locomotive collector.

After graduating from Barrington High School, Blount attended Wentworth Institute of Technology, where he obtained an associate degree (at the time, the highest degree offered at Wentworth) in 1937. He got his entrepreneurial start by carving duck jewelry pins that he sold out of his "Dippy Duck Widdle Shop". During those years Blount continued to design jewellery, worked for his grandfather's oyster company, and was also a mill machinist and plant engineer.

Blount and Mary Ellen Hustad married in 1943, which was followed by brief service in the army.

He got his start in inventing early. In seventh grade he reinvented the steam engine. "It was a crude sort of steam engine that he made from a tin can, an alcohol burner, and a paddle wheel." He honed his inventing talent while creating a steaming process to open clams under the employment of his brother's seafood company.

Blount started a shipbuilding company in 1949. Out of the over 300 ships his company built during his lifetime, over 100 were built in the first 15 years. The company, founded in 1949, was originally named Blount Marine Corporation and later renamed to Blount Boats, Inc. Seeing the potential of the consumer tours market, Blount began to offer cruises. The venture, founded in 1966, was called the American Canadian Caribbean Line.

From the 1970s to the early 2000s Blount offered cruising tours of Narragansett Bay in Rhode Island under the name "Bay Queen Cruises". The ships involved with this venture were named Bay Queen (1977) and Vista Jubilee (1989).

By the 1990s, Blount Marine, now known as Blount Boats, was one of the few independently owned shipyards in the United States building commercial passenger vessels.

In 1960, Blount was admitted as a compatriot of the Rhode Island Society of the Sons of the American Revolution.

== Philanthropy ==
Blount donated millions in time and money to various causes throughout his life. This included giving the University of Rhode Island $300,000 to help build an aquaculture research lab in 2001.

=== Oyster reintroduction ===
Blount was responsible for four million juvenile oysters that were later "planted by the Rhode Island Department of Environmental Management in various parts of Narragansett Bay" in an effort to grow the oyster population in the bay. In early 2003, Blount renewed his efforts with 4,000 adult oysters which, according to marine biologist Matt Jaglieski, produced "over 40 million" fertilized larvae. Two years later he donated 80 acres (320,000 m^{2}) of his land to Roger Williams University to the cause.

Blount's contributions to restoring the Bay earned him an honorary doctorate degree in marine science from Roger Williams University in addition to the University officially dedicating its "state-of-the-art" shellfish hatchery to him.

=== Niagara Prince ===
In 2006 Blount donated the Niagara Prince to three New England schools. The $6.5 million ship was built by Blount and was part of one of his cruise lines. The recipients of the donation were Wentworth Institute of Technology, Rhode Island College, and Roger Williams University. All three had given Blount honorary doctorates.

== External sources and references ==
List of vessels built by Blount Marine

=== Patents ===
- U.S. patent 2,652,410 Esters of alpha-hydroxy acids and their estolides.
- U.S. patent 2,560,153, Ship.
- U.S. patent 3,023,814, Controllable-pitch propeller.
- U.S. patent 3,074,488, Controllable-pitch propeller with trailing edge.
- U.S. patent 3,109,498, Controllable-pitch propeller.
- U.S. patent 3,106,248, Fairing for controllable-pitch propeller.
- U.S. patent 3,119,601, Safety release for trawl wires.
- U.S. patent 3,225,730, Power assist for vessel steering mechanism.
- U.S. patent 3,360,881, Blount method of handling trawl gears.
- U.S. patent 3,300,189, Blount break control.
- U.S. patent 3,504,502, Lift dock for a water borne vessel.
- U.S. patent D219247, Passenger vessel.
- U.S. patent 3,556,052, Method and means for growing oysters.
- U.S. patent 3,584,593, Marine power pod.
- U.S. patent 4,365,580, Hull construction.
- U.S. patent 4,464,486, Foams of silicates and poly(meth)acrylic acids.
- U.S. patent 4,785,802, Prosthesis.
- U.S. patent D357893, Top sides and superstructure portion of a boat.
- U.S. patent 5,036,554, Water saving toilet.
- U.S. patent D372895, Top sides and superstructure of a boat.
- U.S. patent 6,170,425, Boat hull construction and method of making the same.
