= USS Vigilant =

USS Vigilant may refer to several ships of the United States Navy:

- USS Vigilant 14 guns, captured, after a short action, by HMS Levant, 28 guns, in the Mediterranean in June 1777
- USS Vigilant (YT-25), a tug commissioned in 1898 and stricken in 1927
- USS Vigilant (SP-406), later USS SP-406, a patrol boat in commission from 1917 to 1918
- HSV Vigilant (JHSV-2), a joint high-speed vessel, later renamed USNS Choctaw County (T-EPF-2), which entered service in 2013

== See also ==
- USRC Vigilant for ships of the United States Revenue-Marine (1790–1894) and United States Revenue Cutter Service (1894–1915)
- USCGC Vigilant for ships of the United States Coast Guard (1915–present)

== Note ==
- Ships of the United States Revenue-Marine, United States Revenue Cutter Service, and United States Coast Guard were often placed under the authority of the United States Navy during times of war.
