= Vigilant (1794 Baltimore schooner) =

American schooner

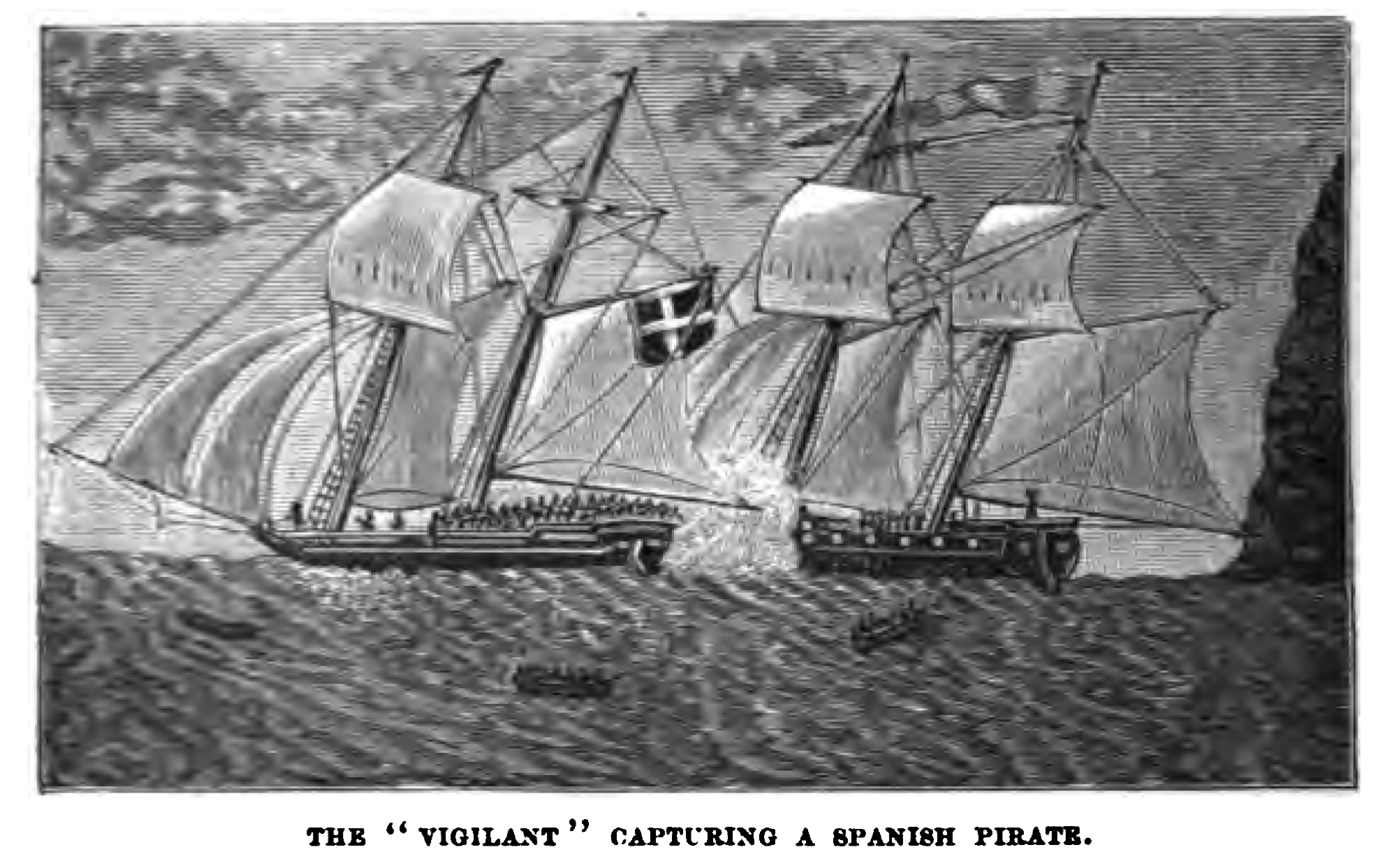
- Vigilant capturing a Spanish pirate

History

United States
- Name: Nonsuch
- Launched: 1794
- In service: 1794
- Fate: Sold

Danish West Indies
- Name: Vigilant
- Out of service: September 12, 1928
- Fate: Sank

General characteristics
- Type: Schooner
- Length: 90
- Beam: 29
- Propulsion: Sails
- Complement: 100
- Armament: 12 cannon

Vigilant was a Baltimore schooner, possibly originally launched in 1794 as Nonsuch. She appeared in the Danish West Indies as Vigilant from 1824. She carried the mail and passenger traffic between St. Croix and St. Thomas in the 19th and the first decade of the 20th century. A storm sank Vigilant on 12 September 1928.

== Career ==
=== American service ===
In her early career she carried flour and cotton down to the West Indies and returned to Baltimore with coffee and sugar. Captain Thomas Boyle commanded her in 1803–1804 under the American flag. (Note: There is a report that she was employed in the slave trade while under the American flag. However, there is no vessel by that name in the database on the Trans Atlantic Slave Trade. Denmark abolished the slave trade in 1803, though she did not abolish slavery in her Caribbean colonies until 1848.)

=== The Danish West Indies ===
Circa 1824 Nonsuch was sold to Danish West Indies' authorities, who renamed her Vigilant and used her for coast guard duties. Most famously, while under the command of Danish Captain Irmminger, with thirty soldiers on board, she captured a Spanish pirate ship that had been cruising and harassing merchant vessels in the narrow passage between St. Thomas and Puerto Rico.

After her coast guard service, Vigilant became a mail and passenger ship. In the late 1800s she would depart St. Thomas twice a week for a five-to-six hour passage to St. Croix. She had many private owners, until the Government of the Danish West Indies purchased her.

In 1865, as steam ships between the islands of St. Thomas and St. Croix became well established the steamer Clara Rothe, 266 tons, replaced Vigilant in her mail packet role. Still Vigilant continued to sail well after the beginning of the next century.

== Loss ==
In the night of 13 September 1876, while at anchor at Christiansted, St. Croix in the Virgin Islands, Vigilant sank during a hurricane. She was raised in October 1876 and repaired by Captain Pentheny, her owner at the time. Again in October 1916, a hurricane took her to the bottom and again she was raised and repaired. On 12 September 1928 she sank again during a severe hurricane in Christiansted Harbor. That time she was beyond repair.
