= Americas' Sail =

North Americas tall ship sailing race

Americas' Sail is a Western Hemisphere tall ship race founded in 1992 as a non-profit association of volunteers from the maritime communities of the United States, Canada, Colombia and the Netherlands. Its headquarters are located in Glen Cove, New York.

== Competitions ==
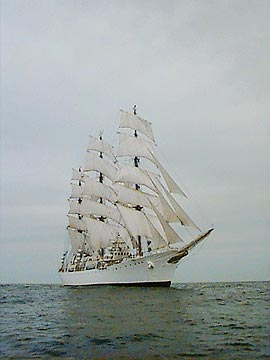
ARA Libertad in full sail

The inaugural race took place in 1995 with twenty-three participants vessels. Norfolk, Virginia, Greenport (Suffolk County), Oyster Bay, Sag Harbor, and New Haven acted as host ports for the event. It included the "Parade of tall ships" in New Haven, a highlight of the 1995 Special Olympics World Summer Games. Venezuela's Simon Bolivar was the winner of that year's golden trophy.

The second Americas' Sail race was run in 1998, with a route between Savannah, Georgia, Greenport (Suffolk County) and Glen Cove, New York, with twenty-one ships participating. For this edition the rules were changed to add specific seamanship skills to the challenge, like timed knot tying, rope throwing, sailing dinghies, lifeboat rowing and water pumping competitions between sailors. Argentina's ARA Libertad won the class "A" gold trophy. The schooner Good Fortune from Edgartown, Massachusetts was awarded the new class "B" silver trophy.

In 2002 the third race ran through the Caribbean and the Gulf of Mexico. Class "A" ships raced from Curacao to Montego Bay, Jamaica. This trophy went to Brazil's Cisne Branco. The class "B" silver trophy was won by MEKA II from Beaufort, North Carolina.

== See also ==
- List of large sailing vessels
