= Velas Sudamerica 2010 =

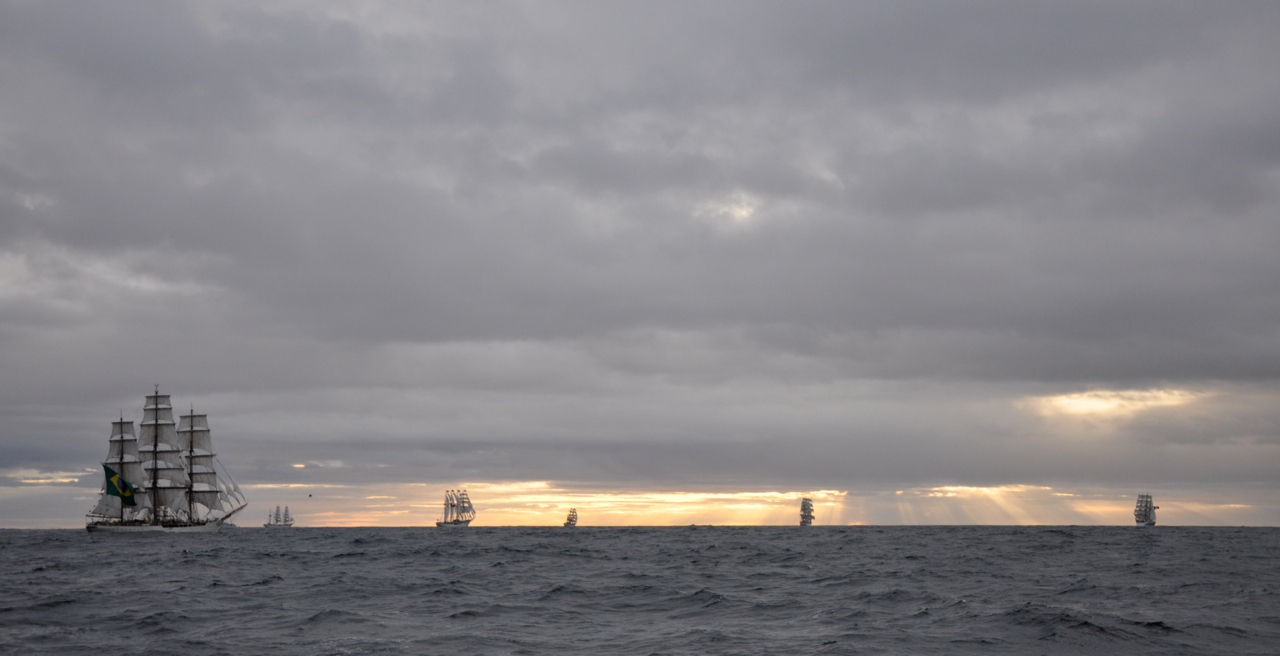
The Velas Sudamérica 2010 fleet turning around Cape Horn

Velas Sudamerica 2010 or Regata del Bicentenario Velas Sudamerica 2010 or, more commonly, Regata del Bicentenario, was a 2010 historic tall ship gathering and touring of Latin America to celebrate the bicentennial of the first national governments of Argentina and Chile, assembled in May and September 1810, respectively. The event was organized by the Argentine and Chilean navies.

== Route ==
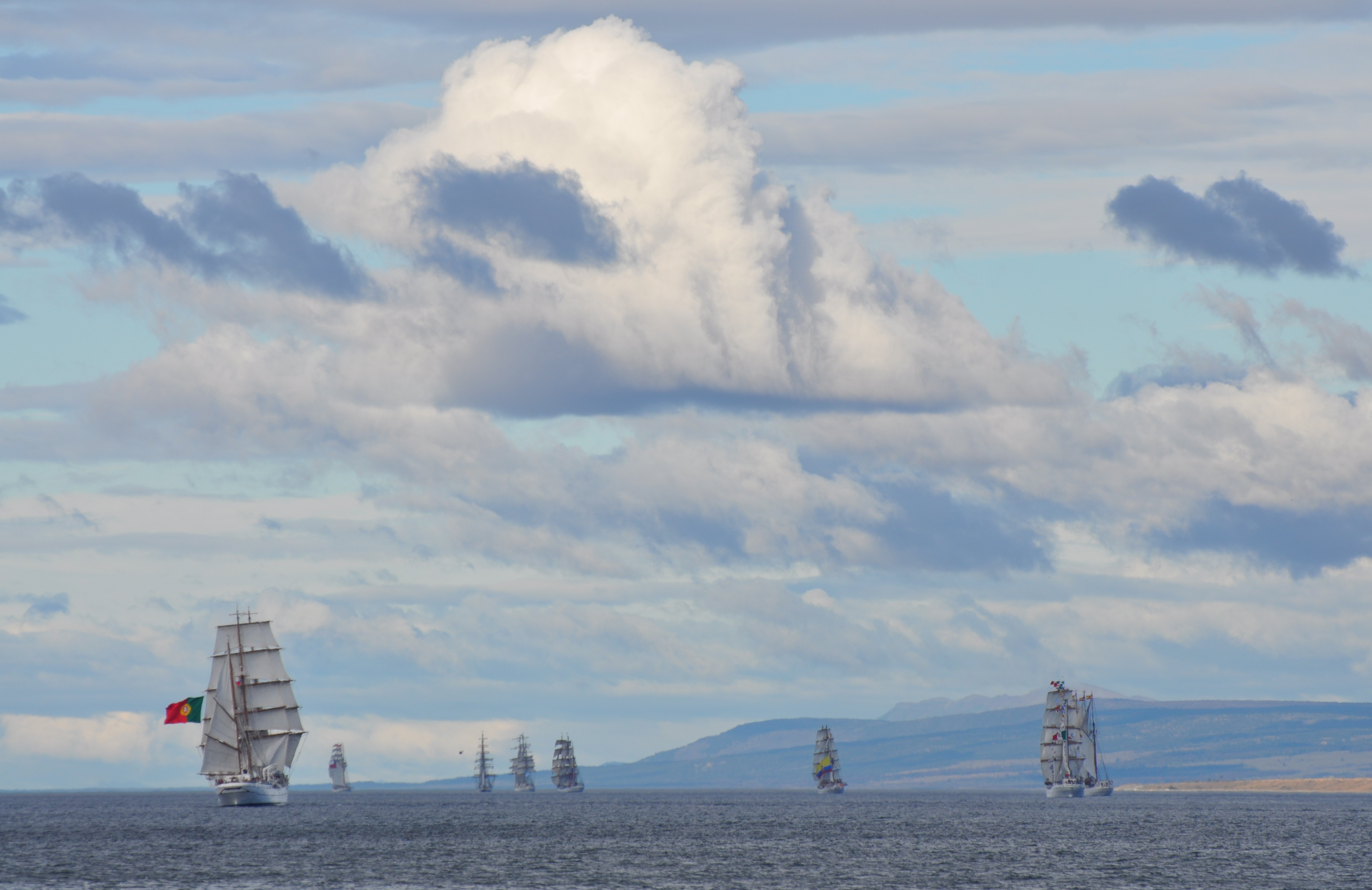
The Velas Sudamérica 2010 fleet crossing the Strait of Magellan

The touring performed around the Latin American continent for nearly five months (traveling about 15,000 nautical miles) and visited thirteen regional ports. It began on 7 February 2010 in Rio de Janeiro, headed south to the South Atlantic, turned around Cape Horn to reach the Pacific Ocean (although some ships chose to cross through the Strait of Magellan for safety reasons), and headed north to cross the Panama Canal and finish on June 28 in Veracruz.

== Participants ==
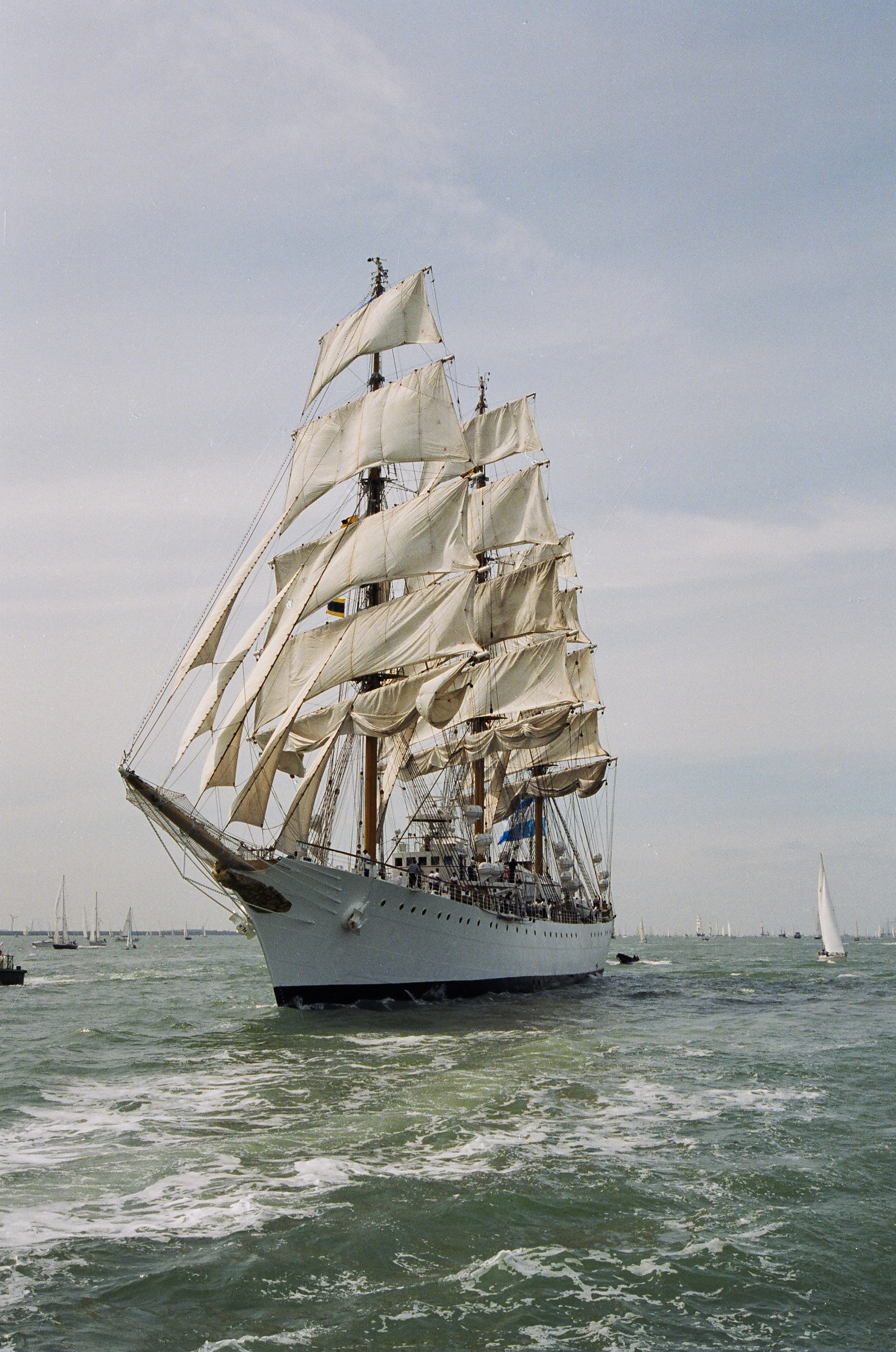
ARA Libertad near port

Sail ship	Country	Port of registry
ARA Libertad	Argentina	Buenos Aires
Esmeralda	Chile	Valparaíso
ARC Gloria	Colombia	Cartagena
Guayas	Ecuador	Guayaquil
Capitán Miranda	Uruguay	Montevideo
Simon Bolivar	Venezuela	La Guaira
Juan Sebastián de Elcano	Spain	Cádiz
ARM Cuauhtémoc	Mexico	Acapulco
NRP Sagres	Portugal	Lisbon
Cisne Branco	Brazil	Rio de Janeiro
Europa	Netherlands	The Hague
Xplore	Panama	Panama City
USCGC Eagle	United States	New London
