= The House on Garibaldi Street =

1979 American television film

- DVD cover
- Based on: The House on Garibaldi Street by Isser Harel
- Screenplay by: Steve Shagan; Isser Harel
- Directed by: Peter Collinson
- Starring: Topol; Martin Balsam; Janet Suzman; Leo McKern; Nick Mancuso
- Music by: Charles Bernstein
- Country of origin: United States
- Original languages: English; Spanish

Production
- Producer: Mort Abrahams
- Cinematography: Allejandro Ulloa
- Editor: Gene Fowler Jr.
- Running time: 98 minutes
- Production company: Charles Fries Productions

Original release
- Network: ABC
- Release: May 28, 1979

The House on Garibaldi Street is a 1979 American television film based on the non-fiction book of the same name, written by Isser Harel. It was directed by Peter Collinson and starred Topol and Martin Balsam. The story is about the Mossad operation that captured Adolf Eichmann in Argentina in 1960 and returned him to Israel for trial.

== Plot ==
Israeli premier David Ben-Gurion approves a Mossad operation to be led by Isser Harel to kidnap Adolf Eichmann, the Nazi mass murder organizer. Harel's team travels to Argentina to track down Ricardo Klement, whom they believe is Eichmann. They soon discover that the Klement family moved two months before. Primo, a local contact, goes to their former residence and gets a lead to Dieter, one of Eichmann's sons. They arrange for a bellboy to deliver a parcel to Dieter, addressed to another son, Nicholas. They trail Dieter, but he goes to the dentist instead of his house. Michael, the agent in charge, sends the bellboy back to the Klements' old address, and he learns their new one. Harel is told that Israel has been invited to send a delegation to Argentina's 150th celebration of its independence, so a special flight can be sent, on which Eichmann can be smuggled out of the country. The Mossad finally spot Eichmann, and Harel flies to Argentina to take over the operation. The Mossad rent three houses near Buenos Aires. They snatch Eichmann off the street and take him to one of the houses. Dieter Eichmann contacts other local Nazis for help in finding his father. The Israeli agents watching Eichmann are conflicted: they want to kill him, but their orders are to bring him back alive. The Israeli special plane arrives. Meanwhile, Michael interrogates Eichmann about his role in the Holocaust. Michael thinks they are on the verge of being caught by the police and should kill Eichmann while they can, but the others talk him out of it. When it is time to leave, they drug Eichmann and disguise him as an Israeli mechanic injured in an accident. A policeman in the pay of the Nazis tries to stop the takeoff, but they persuade the airport officials to let the flight proceed. The plane returns to Israel, where Eichmann is tried, found guilty of crimes against humanity, and executed.

== Cast ==
- Topol as Michael
- Nick Mancuso as Ari
- Janet Suzman as Hedda
- Martin Balsam as Isser Harel
- Leo McKern as David Ben-Gurion
- Charles Gray as Gen. Lischke
- Derren Nesbitt as Arthur Lubinsky
- Alfred Burke as Adolf Eichmann
- John Bennett as Aaron Lazar
- John Cater as Doctor
- Edward Judd as Meged
- Wolf Kahler as Real Estate Agent
- Alberto de Mendoza as Primo
- Simon Shepherd as Nickalous Eichmann
- Gareth Hunt as Kedem
- Antonio Canal as Cordero
- Jeff Waters as Co-Pilot

== DVD ==
The House on Garibaldi Street was released to DVD by MGM on May 1, 2012, as part of the Limited Edition Collection made available as a DVD-on-demand disc sold by Amazon.

== See also ==
- List of Holocaust films
- Eichmann in Jerusalem, Hannah Arendt's account of his trial
- Operation Finale, 2018 theatrical film about Eichmann's capture
