= Simón Bolívar (barque) =

Venezuelan Navy training vessel

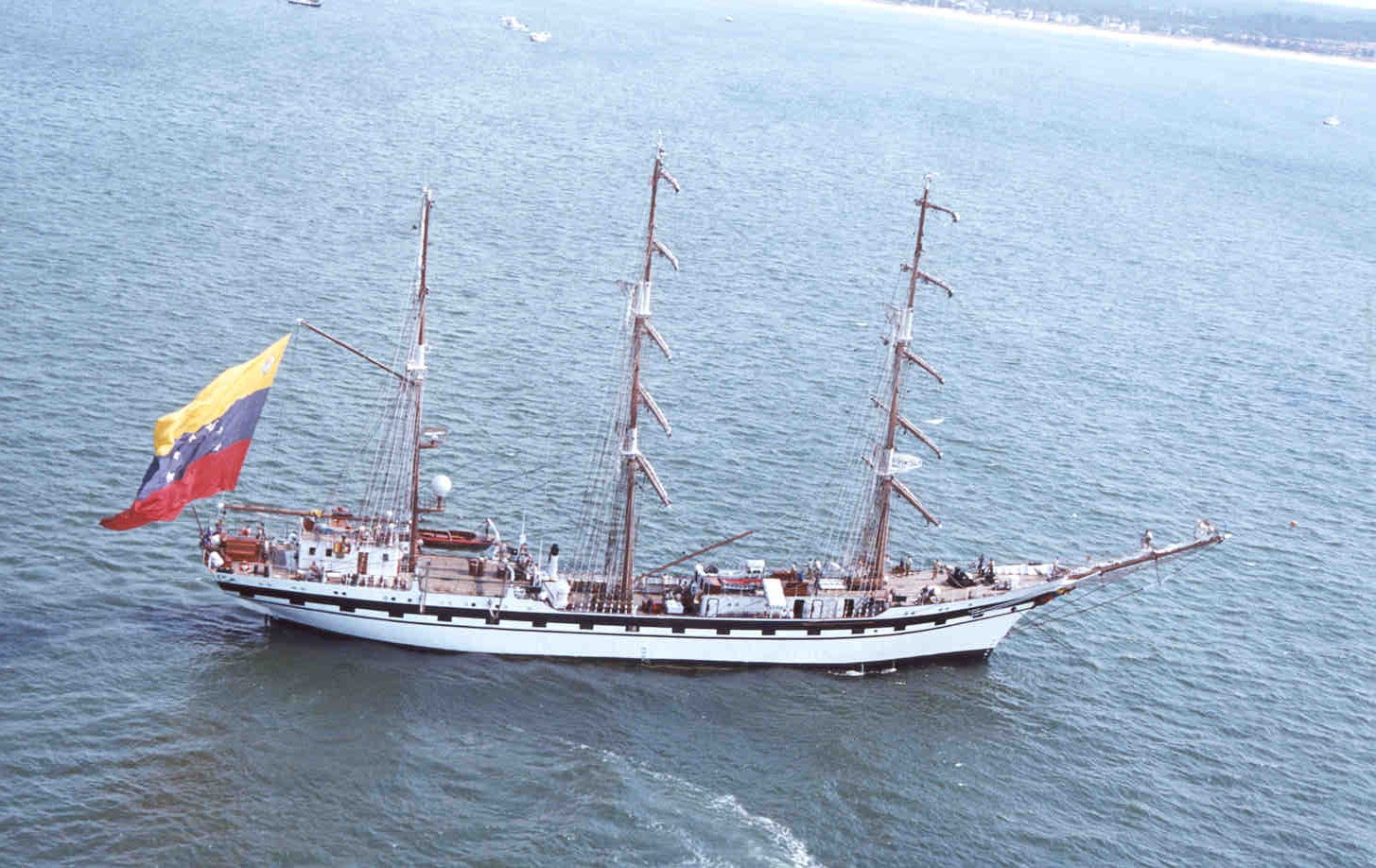
- Simón Bolívar at anchor

History

Venezuela
- Name: Simón Bolívar
- Namesake: Simón Bolívar
- Builder: Astilleros Celaya S.A., Bilbao
- Laid down: 1978
- Launched: 21 November 1979
- Commissioned: 12 August 1980
- Home port: La Guaira
- Identification: Pennant number: BE-11; IMO number: 7825992
- Status: Active as of 2018

General characteristics
- Class & type: Steel class "A" tall ship (Note: Class "A" denotes any sailing vessel over 40m in length and all square-rigged vessels.)
- Displacement: 1260 tons
- Length: 270 ft (82 m) oa
- Beam: 35 ft 1 in (10.7 m)
- Draft: 14 ft 6 in (4.4 m) full load
- Installed power: 750 hp (560 kW)
- Propulsion: 1 Detroit diesel 12V-149t
- Sail plan: Barque; 1650 m^{2} of sail
- Complement: 110 plus 87 cadets

Simón Bolívar is a training vessel for the Venezuelan Navy. She sails from the home port of La Guaira and is a frequent participant in tall ship events. She is named after Simón Bolívar, the liberator of Bolivia, Colombia, Peru, Ecuador, Panama and Venezuela.

== Design ==
Simón Bolívar was built in the Spanish shipyard of Astilleros Celaya in Bilbao, Spain. She is one of four similar barques built as sail training vessels for Latin American navies; her half-sisters are the Mexican Cuauhtémoc, the Colombian Gloria and the Ecuadoran Guayas.

== History ==
She was commissioned on 12 August 1980. She participated in Operation Sail in 1986 and again in 2000, visiting New York City on both occasions. She formed part of the French Voiles de la liberté in 1989, Armada de la liberté in 1994 and Armada du siècle in 1999.

In 1995 she won the golden prize in the international Americas' Sail tall ship race.

From 2002 until 2008 she was in refit at Diques y Astilleros Nacionales Compañía Anónima state shipyard in Puerto Cabello.

She participated in Velas Sudamerica 2010, an historical Latin American tour by eleven tall ships to celebrate the bicentennial of the first national governments of Argentina, Venezuela, Colombia, Chile and Mexico.

She is classified as a Class A Tall Ship by the International Sail Training Association and has the MMSI number 735059037.

== See also ==
- List of large sailing vessels
