= Legacy of the May Revolution =

Legacy of 1810 revolution in Buenos Aires

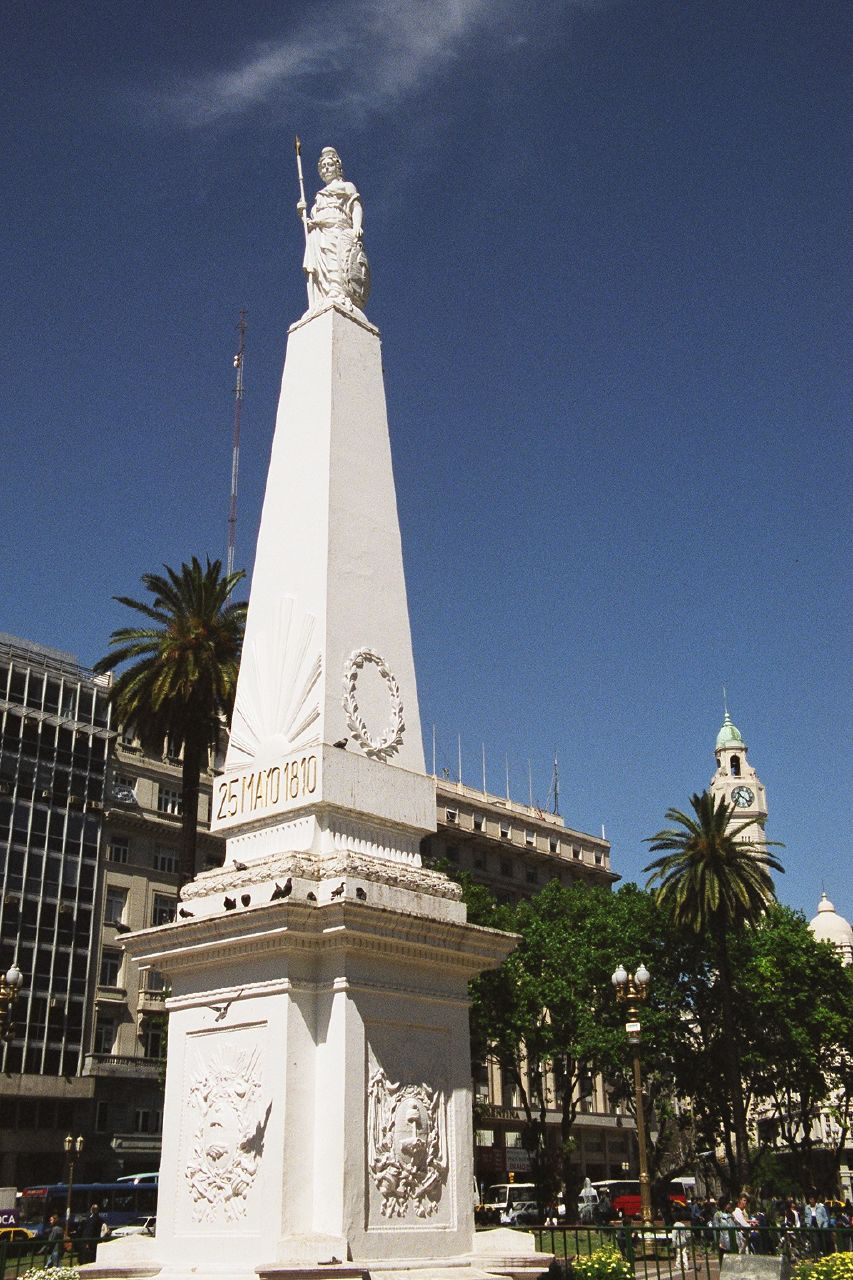
Pirámide de Mayo, commemorative monument on Plaza de Mayo

The May Revolution (Spanish: Revolución de Mayo) was a week-long series of revolutionary events that took place from 18 to 25 May 1810, in Buenos Aires, capital of the Viceroyalty of the Río de la Plata. It started the Argentine War of Independence, and it is considered the birth of modern Argentina.

== Commemorations ==
May 25 is a patriotic date in Argentina, known as First Patriotic Government, with the character of a national holiday. The holiday is set by law 21.329 and it is immovable, meaning it is celebrated exactly on 25 May regardless of day of the week. The Bicentennial of Argentina was celebrated in 2010.

25 May was designated as a patriotic date in 1813, but the Argentine Declaration of Independence provides an alternative national day. In the beginning, this added to the conflicts between Buenos Aires and the provinces during the Argentine Civil War, because the date in May related to Buenos Aires and the date of 9 July related to the whole country. As a result, the unitarian Bernardino Rivadavia canceled the celebration of 9 July, and the federalist Juan Manuel de Rosas re-allowed it, but without giving up celebrations in May. By 1880, with the federalization of Buenos Aires, the local connotations were removed and the May Revolution was considered the birth of the nation.

The date, as well as a generic image of the Buenos Aires Cabildo, are used in different variants to honour the May Revolution. Two of the most notable are the Avenida de Mayo and the Plaza de Mayo at Buenos Aires, near the location of the Cabildo. The Pirámide de Mayo was erected in the Plaza a year after the revolution, and was rebuilt to its present form in 1856. Veinticinco de Mayo ("25 May") is the name of several administrative divisions, cities, public spaces, and landforms of Argentina. There are departments of this name in the provinces of Chaco, Misiones, San Juan, Rio Negro, and Buenos Aires, the latter one holding the Veinticinco de Mayo city. The cities of Rosario (Santa Fe), Junín (Buenos Aires), and Resistencia (Chaco) have eponymous squares. The King George Island is under sovereignty claims of Argentina, Britain, and Chile, as part of the Argentine Antarctica, British Antarctic Territory, and Chilean Antarctic Territory, with Argentina naming it Isla 25 de Mayo.

A commemorative Cabildo is used on coins of 25 cents, and an image of the Sun of May appears on the 5-cent coin of the current Argentine Peso. An image of the Cabildo during the Revolution appeared on the back of the 5-peso banknote of the former Peso Moneda Nacional.

== In popular culture ==
The 25 May anniversary is the subject of articles each year in children's magazines in Argentina, for example Billiken, and is described in textbooks used in primary schools. These publications often omit some aspects of the historical event, as their violence and political content might be considered inappropriate for minors, such as the arming of the population following the preparations for the second British invasion, or the class struggle between the Criollos and the Spanish peninsulares. Children's literature often portrays the revolution as an event devoid of violence that inevitably would have happened one way or another, and the emphasis is on secondary issues such as whether or not it rained that day, or whether the use of umbrellas was widespread or limited to a minority. Presented as archetypal of the revolution is the presence of various workers, including a mazamorreros delivering pies among the people in the plaza on May 25. School plays or TV numbers on the national holiday would include such recreated scenes.

Mute film La Revolución de Mayo

The Argentina Centennial led to the creation of many different works and representations. Chilean painter Pedro Subercaseaux created many related paintings after requests from Ángel Carranza, such as Cabildo abierto del 22 de mayo de 1810; Mariano Moreno writing in his desk; the embrace of Maipú between San Martín and Bernardo O'Higgins; and the first playing of the Argentine National Anthem. Such works would later become canonical images. The centennial led to the production of La Revolución de Mayo, an early silent film, shot in 1909 by Mario Gallo; it premiered in 1910. It was the first Argentine fiction film done with professional actors.

Among the songs inspired by the events of May is the "Candombe de 1810". The tango singer Carlos Gardel sang "El Sol del 25", with lyrics by Domingo Lombardi and James Rocca, and "Salve Patria", by Eugenio Cárdenas and Guillermo Barbieri. Peter Berruti, meanwhile, created "Gavota de Mayo" with folk music.

An analysis of the May revolution from the point of view of literary fiction is the 1987 novel La Revolución es un Sueño Eterno ("The Revolution is an Eternal Dream"), by Andrés Rivera. The narrative is based on the fictional diaries of Juan José Castelli, who was tried for his conduct in the course of the disastrous First Upper Peru campaign. Through the fictional account of a mortally ill Castelli, Rivera criticizes the official history and the nature of the revolution.

The bicentennial in 2010 produced fewer related works than the centennial. Many related books were written close to it, such as 1810, Enigmas de la historia argentina, Hombres de Mayo, and Historias de corceles y de acero.
