= ARA Libertad (Q-2) =

School vessel in the Argentine Navy

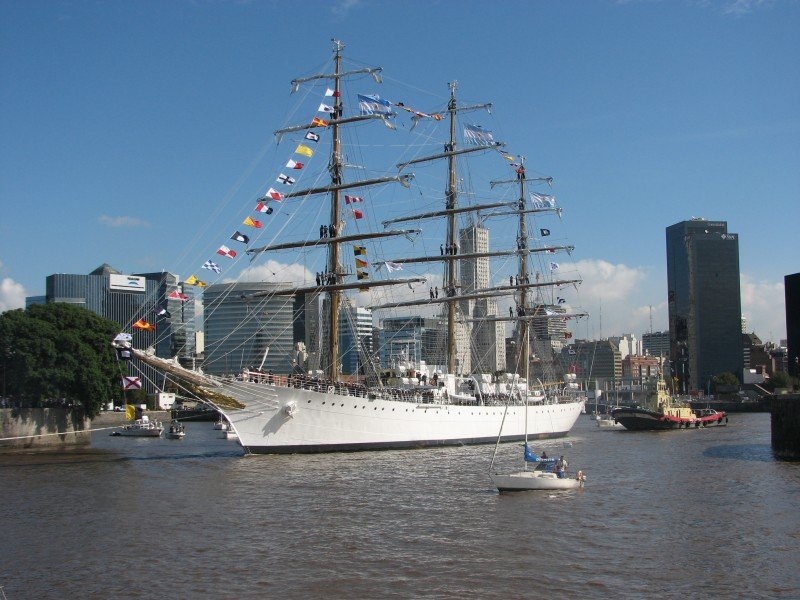
- Libertad entering Dársena Norte, Buenos Aires

History

Argentina
- Name: Libertad
- Owner: Argentine Navy
- Ordered: 13 November 1953 (from a 1946 project)
- Builder: Río Santiago Shipyard, Buenos Aires Province, Argentina
- Laid down: 11 December 1953
- Launched: 30 May 1956
- Commissioned: 28 May 1963
- Identification: MMSI number: 701000001; Callsign: LOLD
- Status: Active

General characteristics
- Type: Steel hulled, full-rigged class "A" tall ship
- Displacement: 3,765 tonnes
- Length: 103.75 m (340.4 ft) (hull 91.7 meters)
- Beam: 14.31 m (46.9 ft)
- Draft: 6.60 m (21.7 ft)
- Installed power: 2,400 hp (1,800 kW)
- Propulsion: Pre mlu: 2 × Sulzer diesel engines Post mlu: 2 × MAN diesel engines B&W mod. 6L23/30-D, each with 6 inline cylinders and 960 kW at 900 rpm
- Speed: Pre mlu: 13.5 knots (25.0 km/h) ^{(engine power only)} Post mlu: 13.73 knots (25.43 km/h) ^{(engine power only)}
- Range: 12,000 nautical miles (22,000 km) at 8 knots (15 km/h) ^{(engine power only)}
- Complement: 24 officers, 187 crewmen, as well as 150 cadets
- Armament: 4 47 mm QF 3 pounder Hotchkiss cannons

ARA Libertad (Q-2) is a steel-hulled, full-rigged, class "A" sailing ship that serves as a school vessel in the Argentine Navy. One of the largest and fastest tall ships in the world, holder of several speed records, she was designed and built in the 1950s by the Río Santiago Shipyard, Ensenada, Argentina. Her maiden voyage was in 1961, and she continues to be a training ship with yearly instruction trips for the graduating naval cadets as well as a traveling goodwill ambassador, having covered more than 800,000 nautical miles (1,500,000 km) across all seas, visited about 500 ports in more than 60 countries, and trained more than 11,000 navy graduates.

== Specifications ==
The ninth Argentine Navy vessel to bear the name Libertad, she has a total length (including bowsprit) of 103.75 m; a beam of 14.31 m; a draft of 6.60 m; and a displacement of 3,765 tonnes: these figures place ARA Libertad as the world's sixth longest tall ship and the third heaviest in displacement. Her complement is 357, including 24 officers, 187 crewmen and 150 naval cadets, among them an ever-increasing number of invited officers from friendly nations' armed forces, personnel from the Argentine Army, Air Force and Coast Guard, students, journalists and distinguished people from different areas and disciplines, both local and foreign.

The ship's follows the archetypal windjammer design, with a clipper bow and a wood-carved figurehead representing Liberty in a long flowing robe and a cruiser stern bearing the Argentine coat of arms in cast bronze.

She is an all square rigged vessel, with bowsprit and three steel masts –Fore, Main (height of 56,2m), and Mizzen with boom– with double topsails and five yardarms each, which can rotate up to 45 degrees on each side. Five jibs are fixed to the bowsprit. All masts have five square sails, with the foremast and mainmast having three staysails, and the mizzen, a spanker, summing up 27 dacron sails with a total sail area of 2,652 square meters. Masts have a circular cross section, formed by welded steel sheets between 9.5mm and 12mm thick.

The vessel carries four fully functional 47 mm QF 3 pounder Hotchkiss cannons, 1891 model, which were transferred from the previous school ship ARA Presidente Sarmiento. Although only used as a protocolar salute battery, these cannons make Libertad the second most heavily armed tall ship in the world.

== History ==
=== Design, construction and commissioning ===
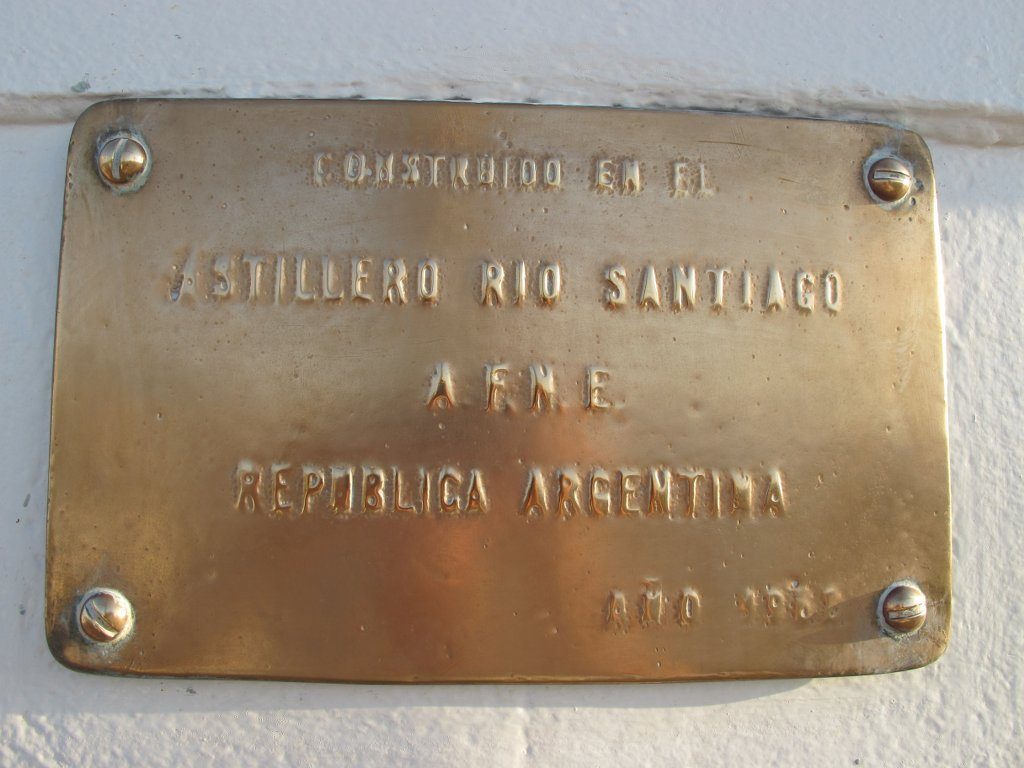
A bronze plaque reading "Built at Río Santiago Shipyard – A.F.N.E. Argentine Republic – Year 1962" (in Spanish) on board ARA Libertad

Continuously since 1873 the Argentine Navy had a number of commissioned school ships in active service for training future officers in seamanship skills. In 1938, after retirement of ARA Presidente Sarmiento as seagoing academy vessel, her role was temporarily undertaken by the light cruiser ARA La Argentina. The project for a definitive replacement ship fully conceived and built by Argentines started in 1946.

On 11 December 1953, during Juan Domingo Perón's second term, the vessel's keel was laid down at the Río Santiago Shipyard, A.F.N.E. ("State Shipbuilding and Naval Factories", itself a peronist creation). Between 1954 and 1955 the shipyard engineers included several modifications to the vessel's original design and configuration. During the de facto government of the self called "Liberating Revolution" the name "Libertad" was imposed by decree number 7922 (April 27, 1956).

On 30 May 1956 she was launched to sea, but her completion and commissioning suffered the vicissitudes of that Argentine period's unease political situation. The sea trials began in March 1961 and were carried to term under the command of Captain Atilio Porretti, who ordered changes to the vessel's rigging and figurehead. During this baptism voyage the ship successfully rode out a violent South Atlantic Ocean tempest. In March 1962 she joined the Navy's Instruction Division, formally starting out as the country's school ship. One year later, on 28 May 1963, the finished frigate was delivered to the Argentine Navy and, with the ceremonial hoisting of the Argentine Ensign, formally commissioned to replace ARA La Argentina as the Navy's school ship. On June 19, and without her figurehead attached (still being carved in wood by Galician-Argentine sculptor Carlos García González), she sailed from Buenos Aires on her first training voyage in command of Captain Horacio Ferrari, along with officers Orlando Perez Cobo, Heinz Otto Grunewald, and Lieutenant Commander Mario A. Manfredi as public relations officer.

=== Trophies and notable voyages ===
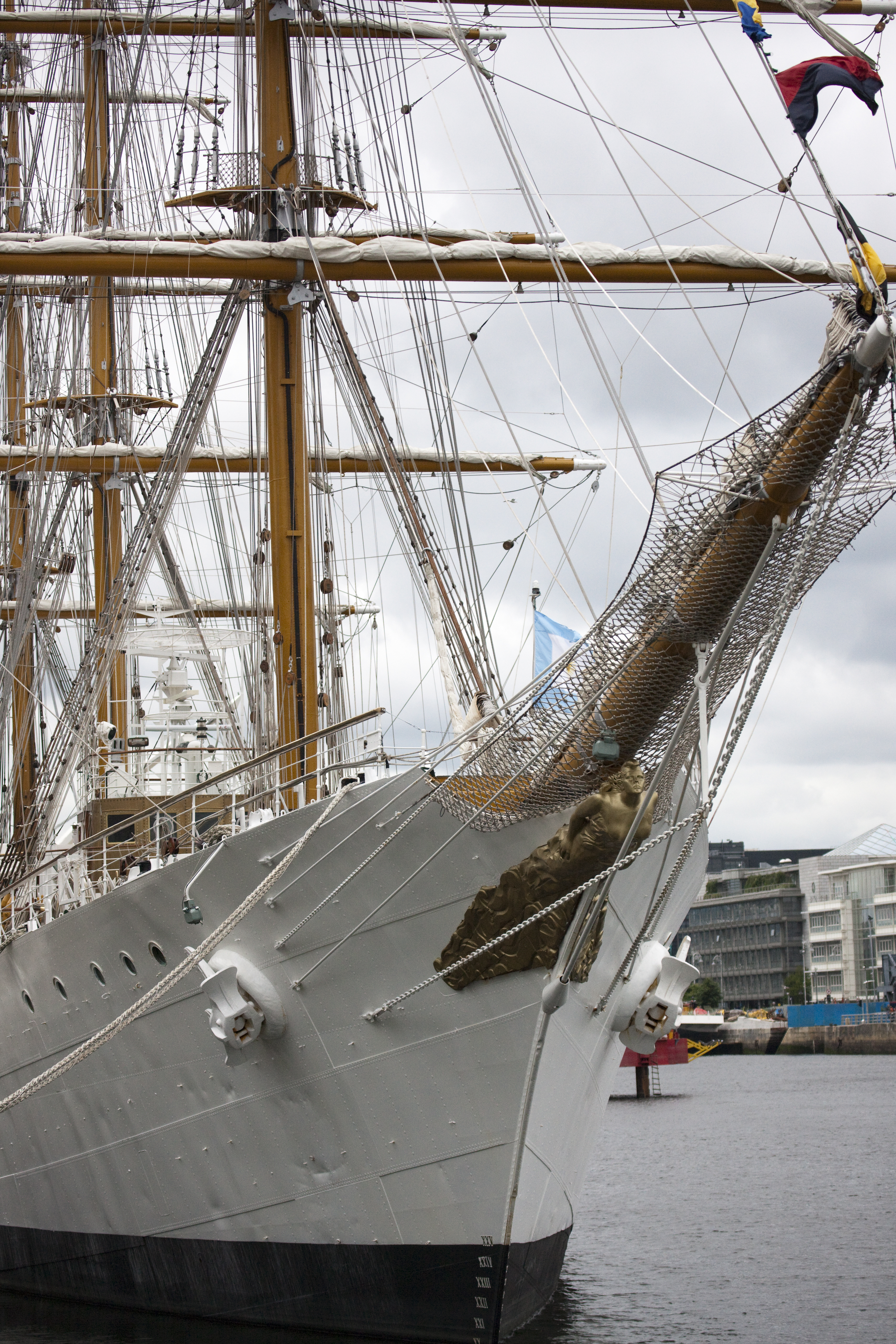
Bow view of Libertad docked in Dublin

In 1964 the frigate competed for the first time in a major offshore race for tall ships between the ports of Lisbon and Hamilton, Bermuda. In 1965 she completed her first round-the-world trip.

In 1966, during her fourth instruction voyage, ARA Libertad won the Great Medal Prize for establishing the tall ships' world record for crossing the North Atlantic Ocean using only sail propulsion. She did so by running between Cape Race (Canada) and the imaginary line going from Dublin to Liverpool –2,058.6 nautical miles (3,812.5 km)– in 8 days and 12 hours, a record that has not been beaten. During the same trip, she also set the 124-hour run record for a sail school ship at 1,335 nautical miles, for which she was awarded the Boston Teapot Trophy. The captain was Commander Ricardo Guillermo Franke, and the Boston Teapot was presented by Prince Philip, Duke of Edinburgh in name of Queen Elizabeth II. Libertad has won the Boston Teapot Trophy nine times in total: in 1966, 1976, 1981, 1985, 1987, 1992, 1998, 2000, and 2007.

In 1970 she was part of the "Parade of Large Sailboats" in Sydney celebrating the bicentenary of the first European settlement in Australia.

The ship took part in the celebrations of the United States Bicentennial on July 4, 1976, by sailing in parade, with many other tall ships from all over the world, on the Hudson River, in front of New York City, in what was called Operation Sail. She also participated in 1964, 1986, 1992 and 2012. During 1976's Operation Sail the Spanish ship Juan Sebastián Elcano collided with Libertad and with the full-rigged, three masted Norwegian ship Christian Radich just off the coast of Bermuda. The collision snapped Elcano's foremast just above the forecourse yardarm, forcing her to abandon the race and return to New York under engine power. Libertad suffered only light damage (two torn sails, smashed lifeboats and port rail) and, like Christian Radich, continued in the competition without problems.

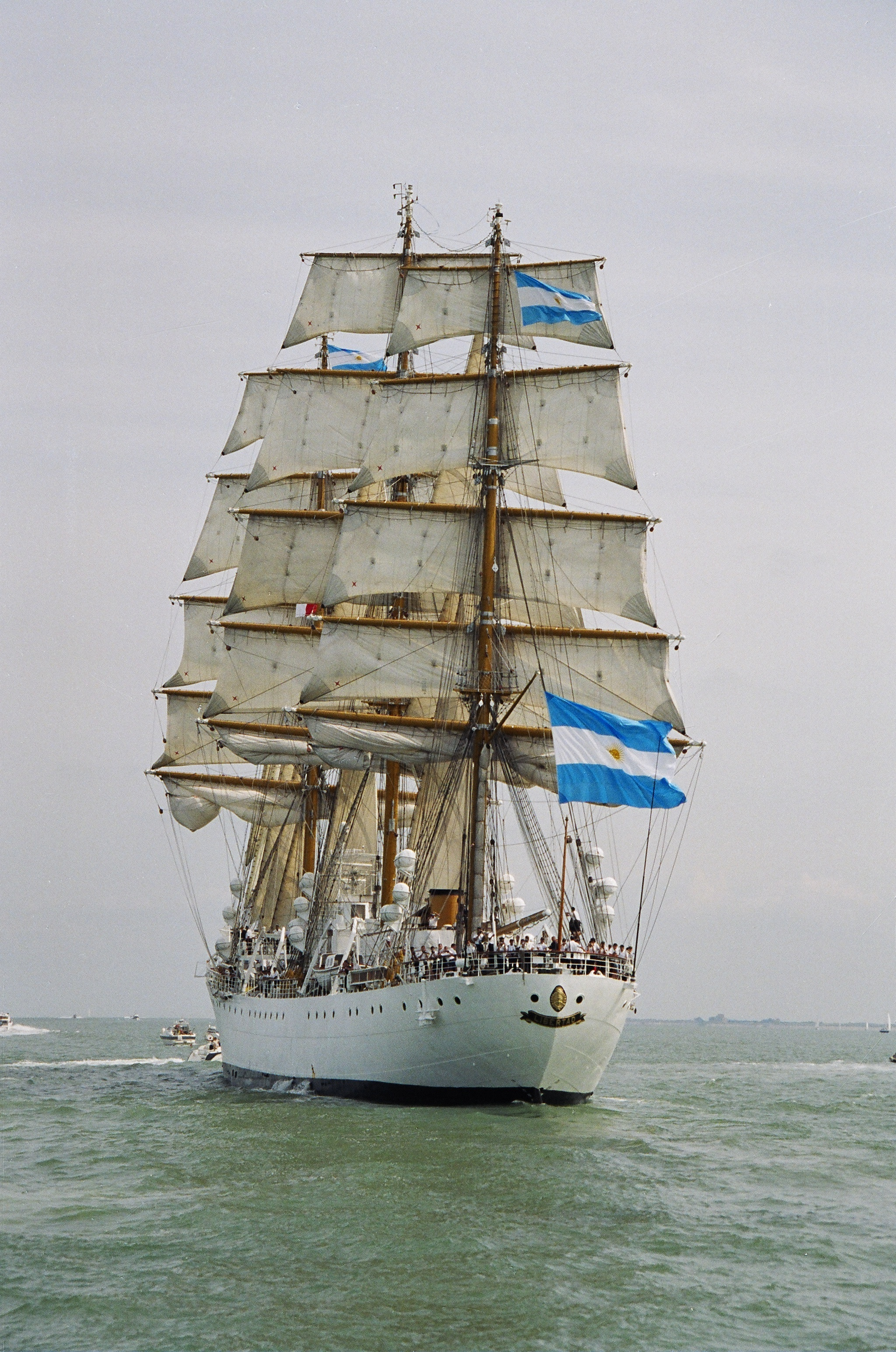
Libertad in 2003 sailing away with furled lower sails

In 1985 raced in "Sail Amsterdam" in the Netherlands and in the celebrations for the Statue of Liberty centenary in New York City. One year later Libertad sailed in Bremerhaven in Germany. In 1989, among many events, she was part of "Les Voiles de la Liberté" for the bicentennial of the French Revolution in the port of Rouen, France.

In 1992 was part of the great Cádiz regatta in commemoration of the 500 anniversary of Columbus' 1492 voyage. In 1997 she sailed in the international race "Sail Osaka 97" in celebration of the 100th anniversary of the port of Osaka, Japan.

In 1998 Libertad won Americas' Sail tall ship race between Savannah, Georgia and Glen Cove, New York, United States.

In 1999 took part in the gathering of tall ships "The Navy of the Century" in France.

By presidential decree number 727 (May 30, 2001) the frigate was designated as "Embassy of the Republic as a matter of honorary distinction and with purely protocolar effect".

On 2 October 2003, she caught fire while anchored off the Spanish port of Ferrol during that year's training trip. The incident severely damaged the ship's hull and bedrooms of aspiring midshipmen, and five sailors were hospitalized for smoke inhalation. Three fire fighting squads brought the fire under control after three hours. Following this incident, between 2004 and 2006 the instructional trips were made aboard the multipurpose ship Hercules.

ARA Libertad participated in Velas Sudamerica 2010, an historical Latin American tour by eleven tall ships to celebrate the bicentennial of the first national governments of Argentina and Chile.

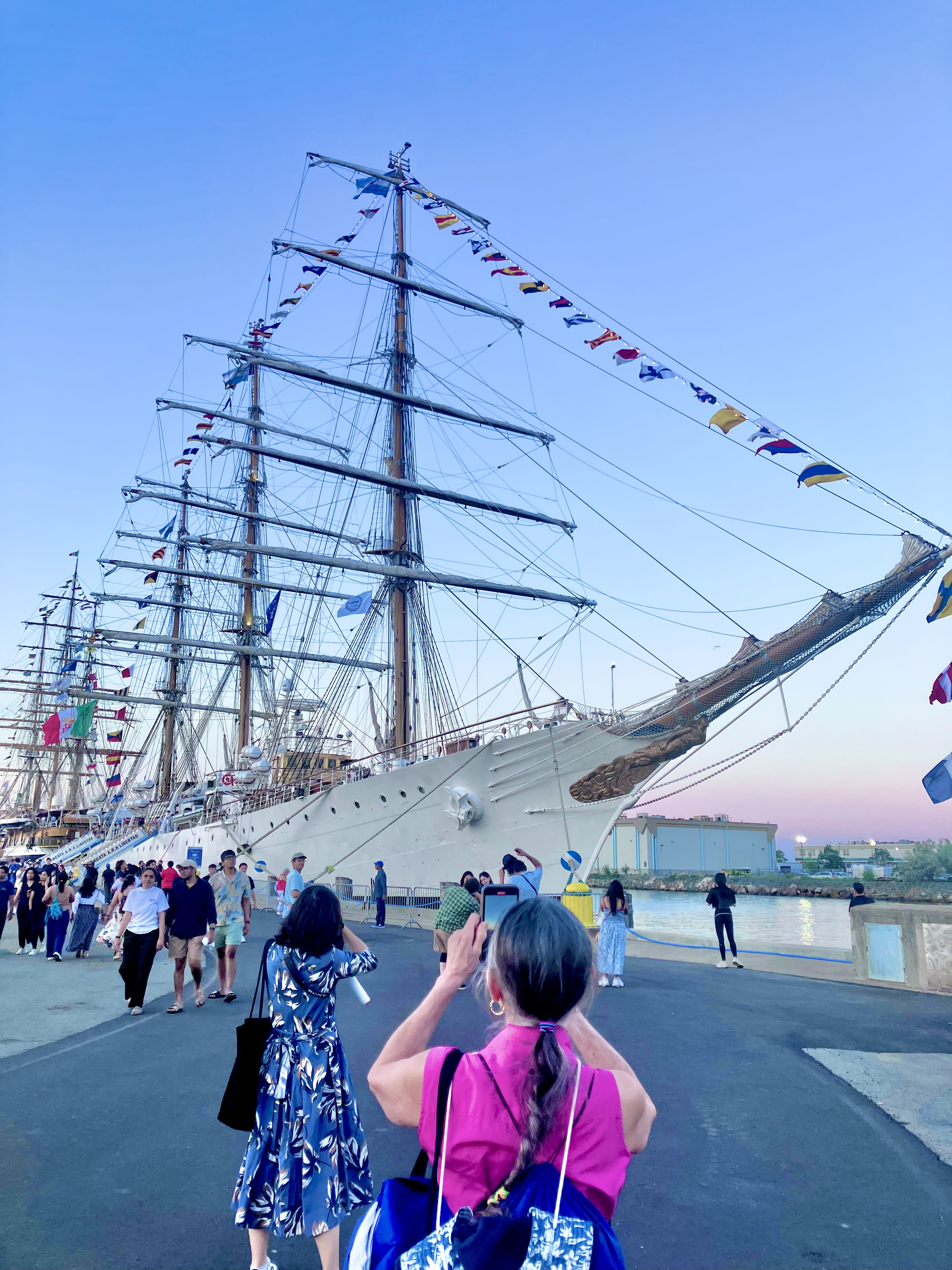
Libertad seen from Pier 5 in Boston's Seaport on July 12, 2026, open for public viewing and boarding as part of the Sail250 and Sail Boston 2026 celebrations.

ARA Libertad participated in Sail 250 during America's 250th celebration. The ship visited American cities with other tall ships from around the world, with its itinerary including stops in New Orleans; Norfolk, Virginia; Baltimore; New York City; Boston; Kingston, Jamaica; San Juan, Puerto Rico; and Rio de Janeiro.

=== Mid-life upgrade ===
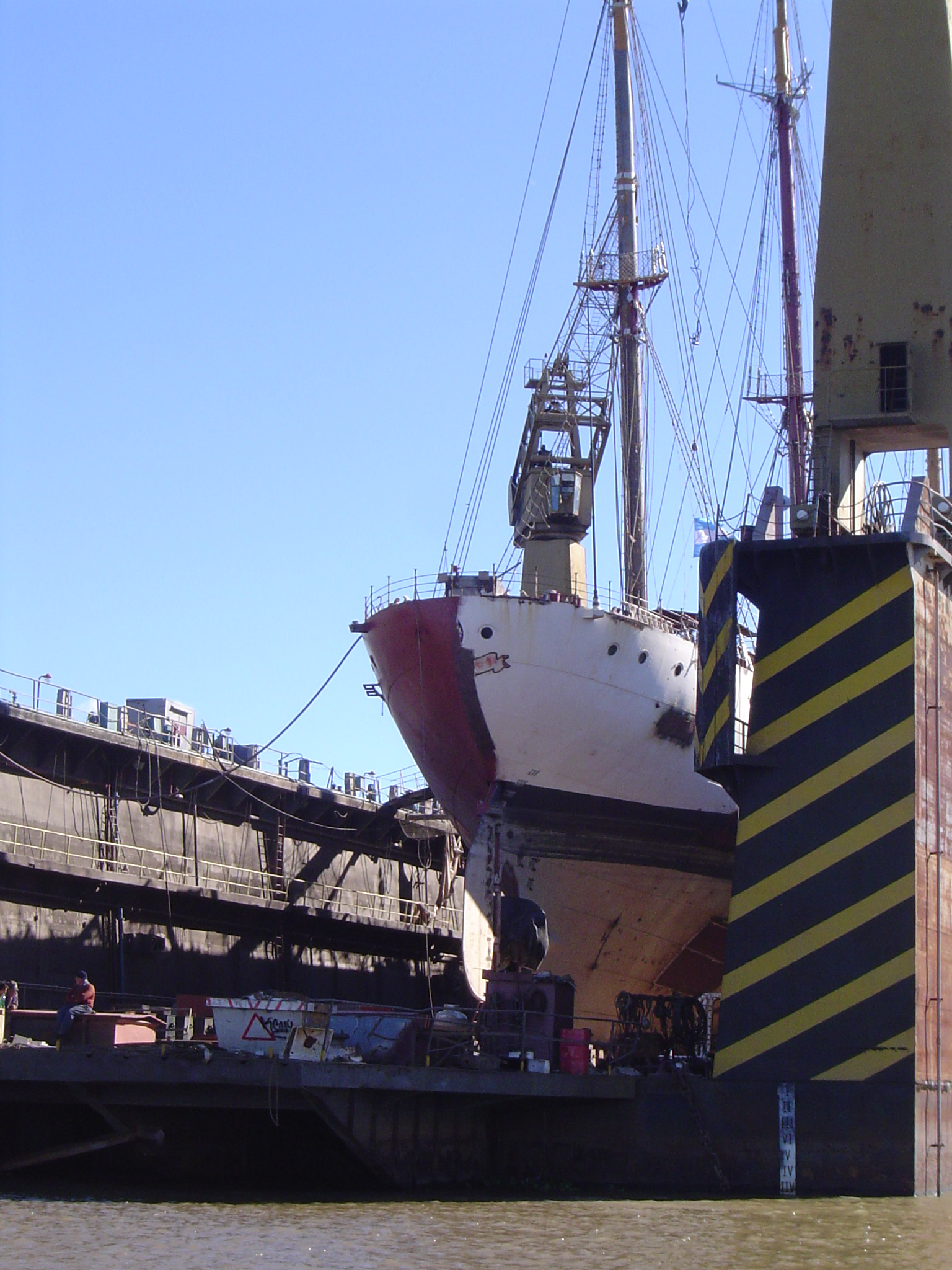
Libertad being updated at Río Santiago

In 2004 she underwent a general mid-life update with special effort put into security and comfort, seeking to extend the vessel's lifespan for at least another forty years. The extensive works were finished in April 2007 and included:

- New integral painting
- Replacement of all Burma teak linings
- Modernization of steering gear
- Renewal of kitchens, laundry, nursing and dental office equipment
- Upgrading of all light appliances
- Replacement of all ship's piping and vents, using new materials and adapting them to the new embedded systems
- Building foundations for the new systems and equipment parts

The overhaul, performed at Río Santiago Shipyard by more than 350 workers, required 285 tonnes of metal for the hull, decks and internal structures and over 25 tonnes of different shaped steel profiles.

Bedrooms and bathrooms were refitted to allow the incorporation of female midshipmen, corporals and sergeants, in line with current diversity policies in the Argentine Navy. The propulsion plant was upgraded to two MAN B&W turbocharged diesel engines mod. 6L23/30-D, each with six inline cylinders and 960 kW at 900 rpm that improved performance to a maximum speed of 13.73 knots and a cruising speed of 12.5 knots (from previous 13.5 and 8 knots respectively) This modification included replacing the propeller shaft.

The radar navigation system was replaced by an advanced model that holds greater scope and definition. The vessel update also included changing all power, communications, alarm, signalling and monitoring cabling, an adaptation required for the newly incorporated systems. The rigging was fully upgraded, which included bringing down, checking and repairing the spars, and renewing more than 55,000 meters of ropes, shrouds, backstays and steel cables.

During the three years Libertad was under overhaul, cadets sailed on the Navy's corvettes ARA Rosales, ARA Spiro, ARA Parker and on the Chilean Navy school ship Esmeralda (BE-43)

=== Ghana incident ===
In early October 2012 the vessel was impounded in the port of Tema, Ghana, by a court ruling in favour of NML Capital, a subsidiary of Cayman Islands hedge fund Elliott Management Corporation, which claimed that it was owed US$370m (£233m) as a consequence of Argentina's debt defaults of 2002, and was seeking payment of $20m for release of the vessel. NML was not originally a creditor, but bought the debt for "pennies on the dollar" according to Forbes. Argentina's foreign ministry condemned the move, claiming it as "a stunt" pulled by "vulture funds, who are not subject to the laws of any jurisdiction".

On 25 October 2012 most of the ship's crew returned to Argentina, leaving the captain and 43 crew members with the ship in Ghana.

On 15 December 2012 the International Tribunal for the Law of the Sea ruled unanimously that the ship had immunity as a military vessel, and ordered that "Ghana should forthwith and unconditionally release the frigate ARA Libertad", and report to the Tribunal on compliance by 22 December. Libertad was released from Tema on 19 December. She arrived on 9 January 2013 to the port of Mar del Plata, where the ship got an enthusiastic homecoming. Following the International Tribunal ruling, the Ghana Ports and Harbours Authority sued NML Capital for damages of least US$7.6 million related to the Libertad's impoundment. The Supreme Court of Ghana ruled in June 2013 that the 77-day impoundment was "unjustified, and could have endangered the security of Ghana by triggering a diplomatic conflict."

== Honors and decorations ==
- Medal of Honor to the Naval Merit "Commander Pedro Campbell", awarded by the Navy of Uruguay.
- Order of Naval Merit, awarded by the Navy of the Dominican Republic.
- Order of Naval Merit Admiral Padilla, awarded by the Navy of Colombia.
- Order of Rio Branco, awarded by the Federative Republic of Brazil.

== Depictions in Popular Culture ==
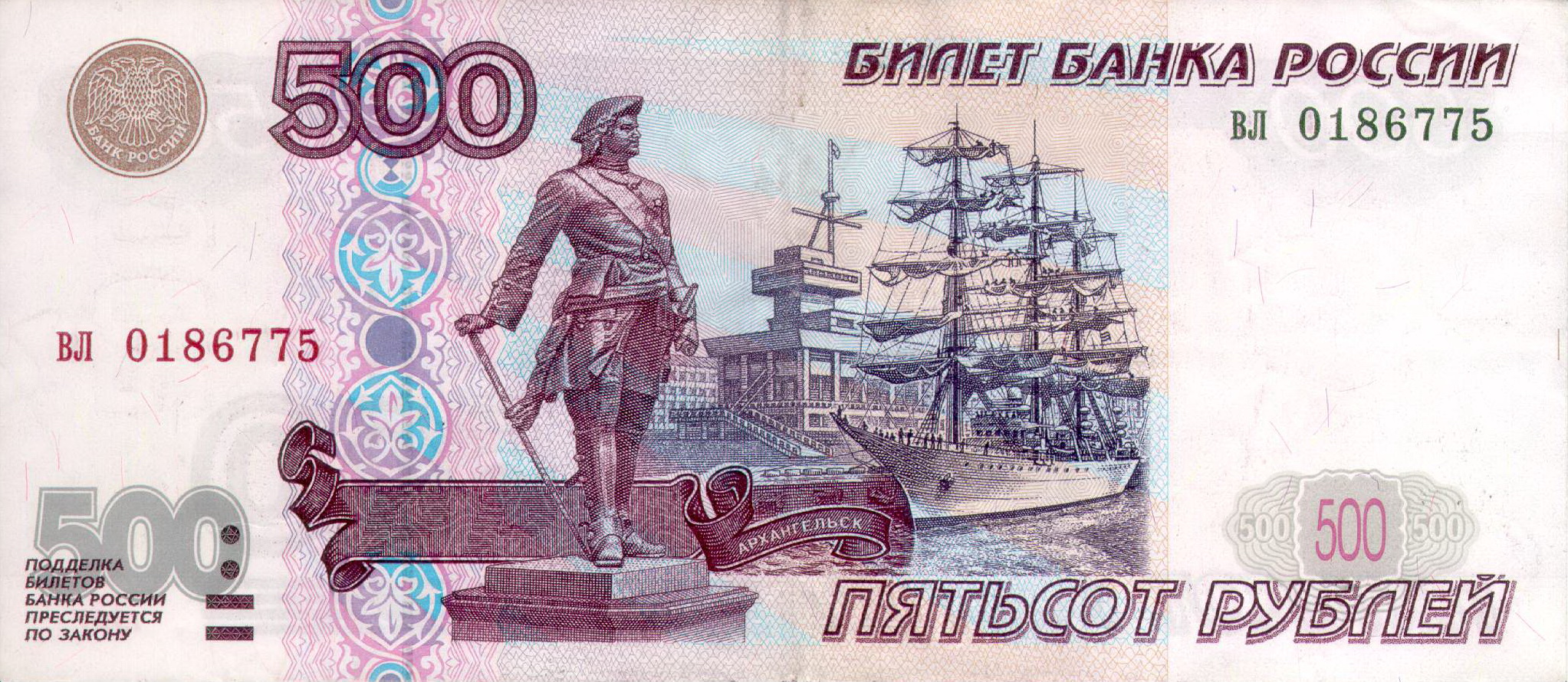
500 rubles

The Libertad is depicted in the port of Arkhangelsk on the Russian 500,000-ruble bill (1997) and 500-ruble bill (1998, 2001, 2004). According to Honored Artist of Russia Igor Krylkov, his original design featuring a steamship was rejected by the Central Bank of Russia, which preferred a sailing boat. Krylkov then substituted a new ship based on the first photograph he found of a large frigate, not knowing he was drawing a ship that had never been to Arkhangelsk.

== Gallery ==
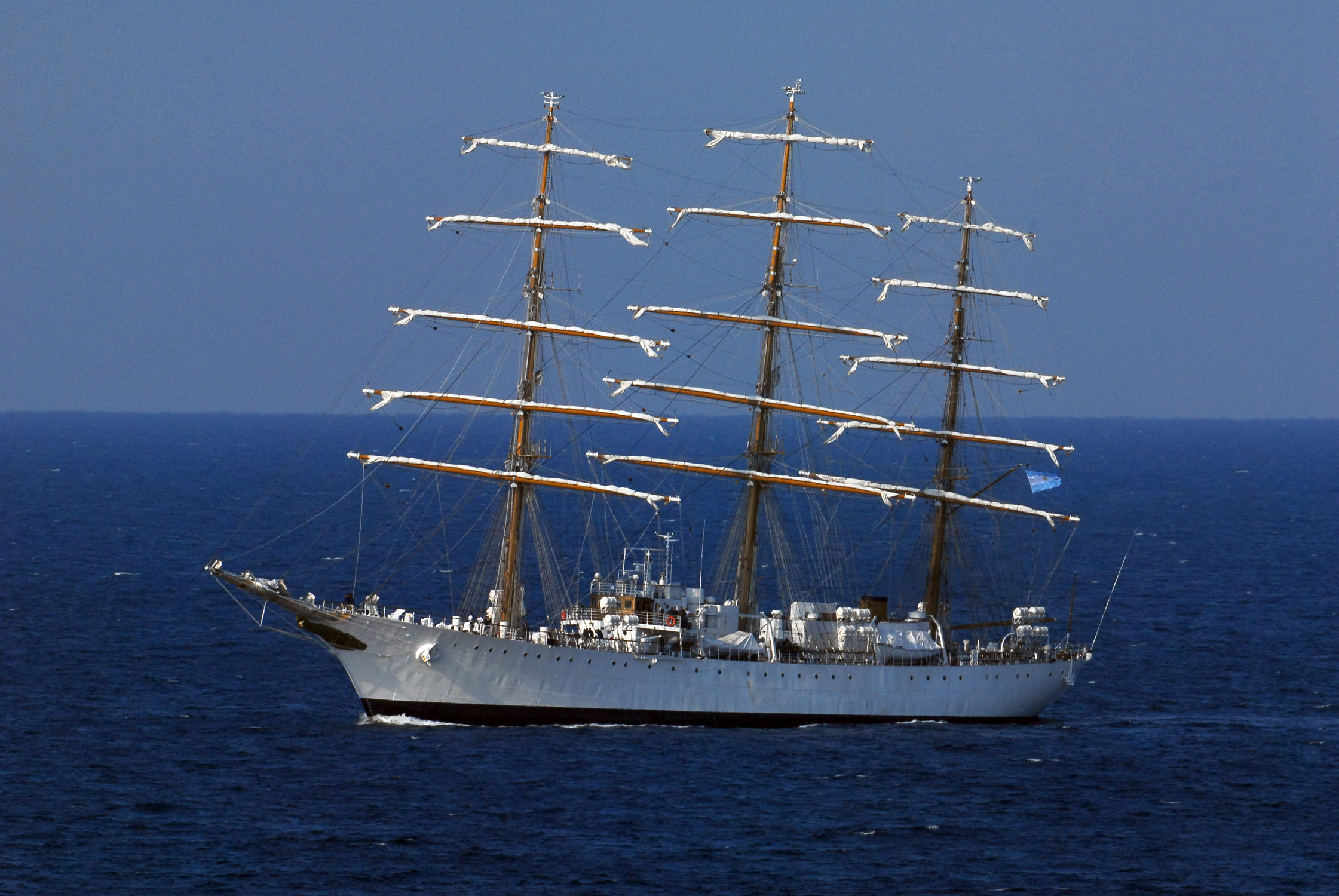
Atlantic Ocean in May 2007

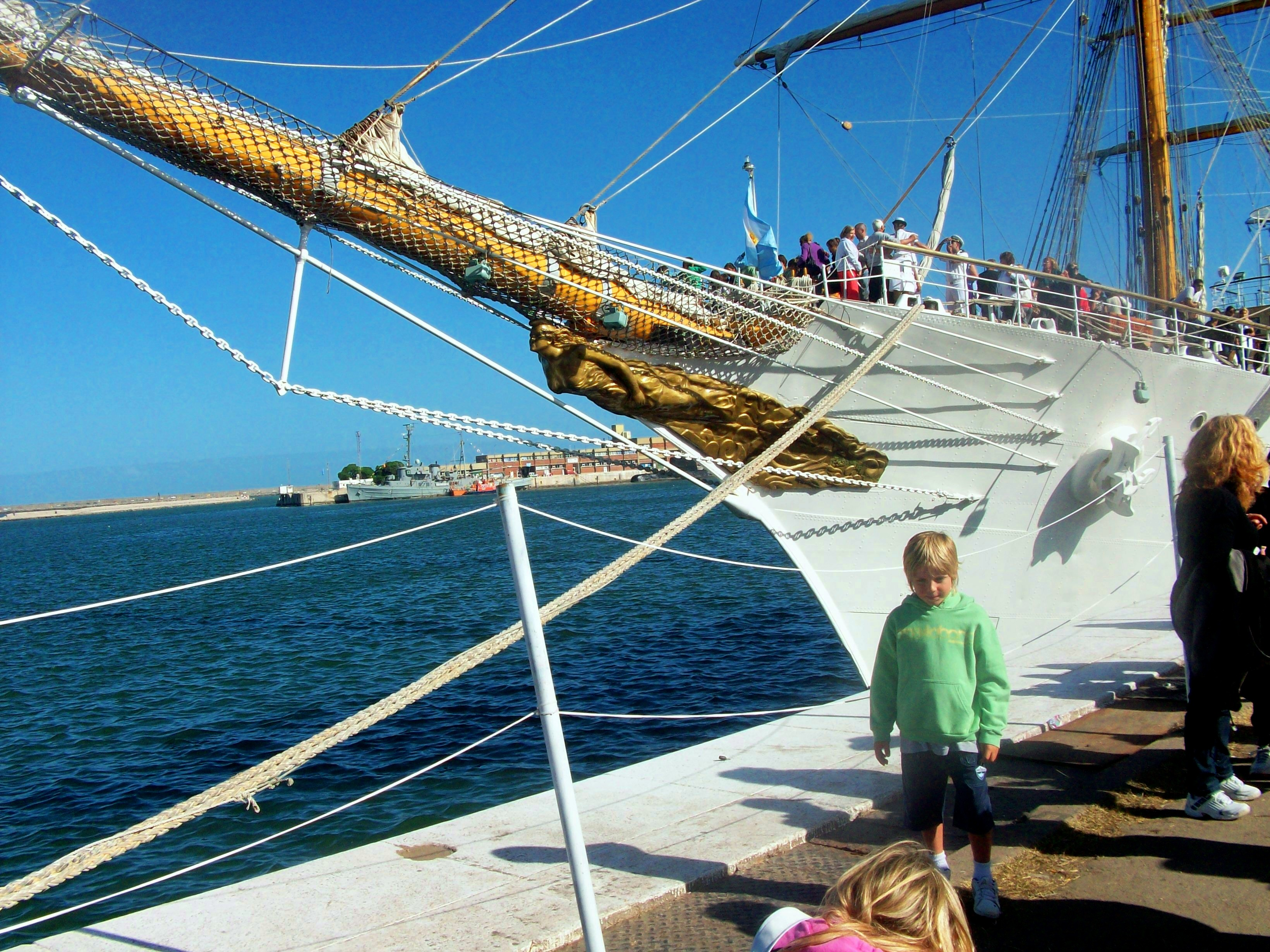
Detail of the bowsprit and the figurehead while docked at Mar del Plata Naval Base in 2010

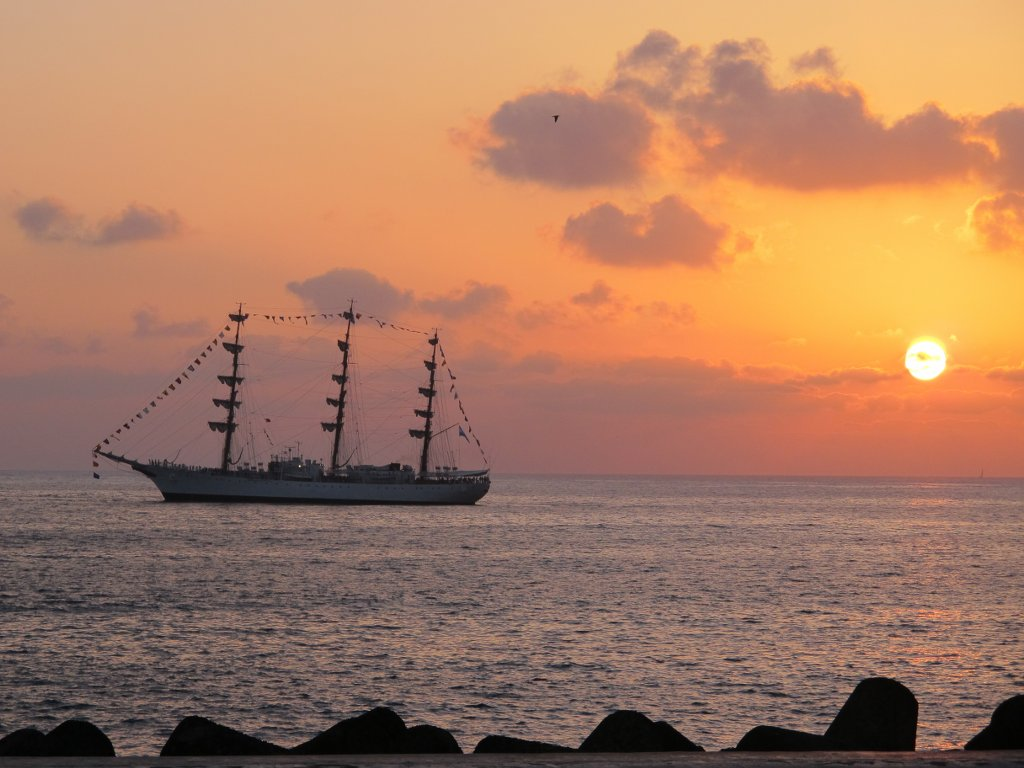
Anchored off Gran Canaria

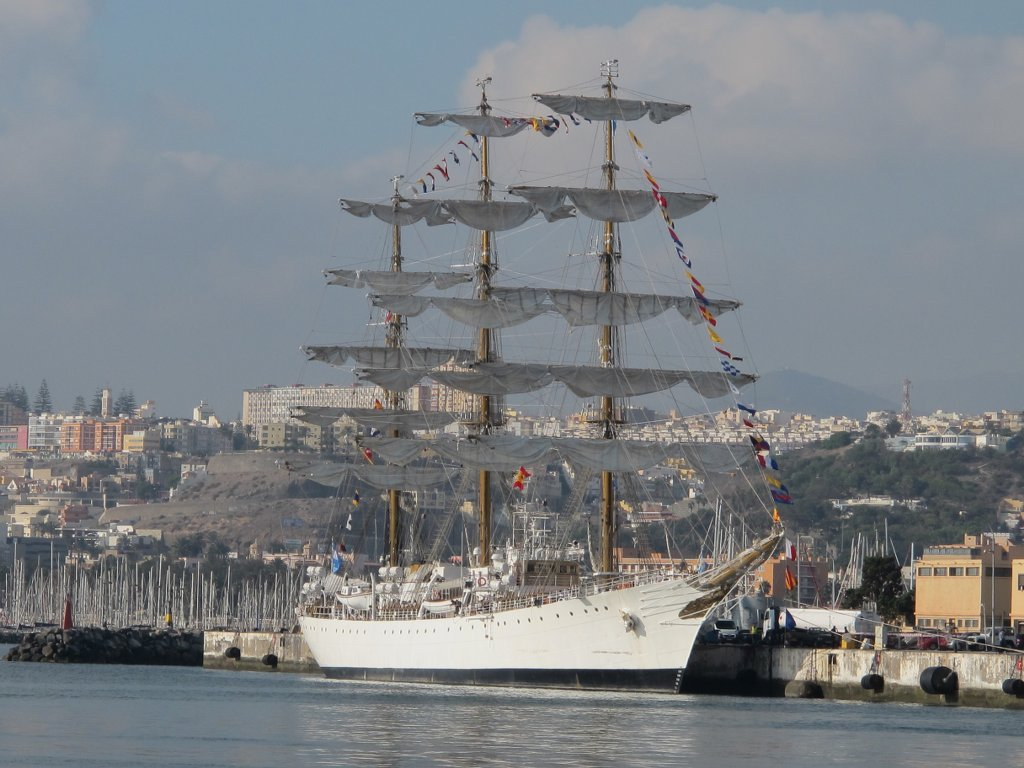
Docked at Las Palmas, Gran Canaria

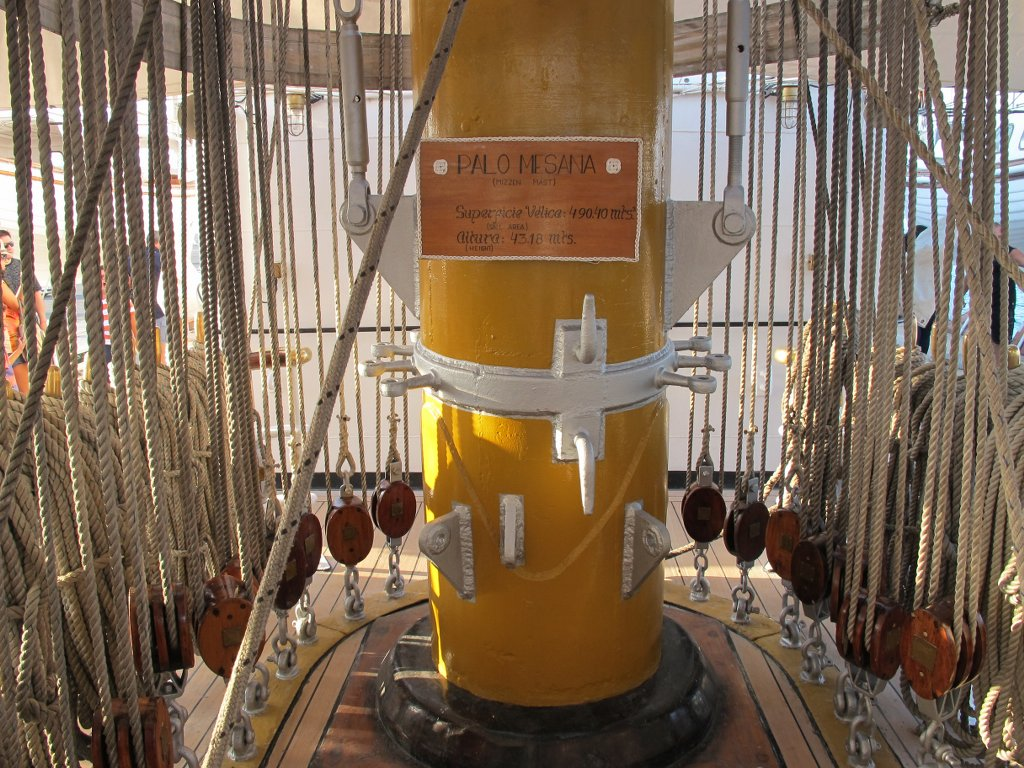
Fore mast, 43.18 meters high

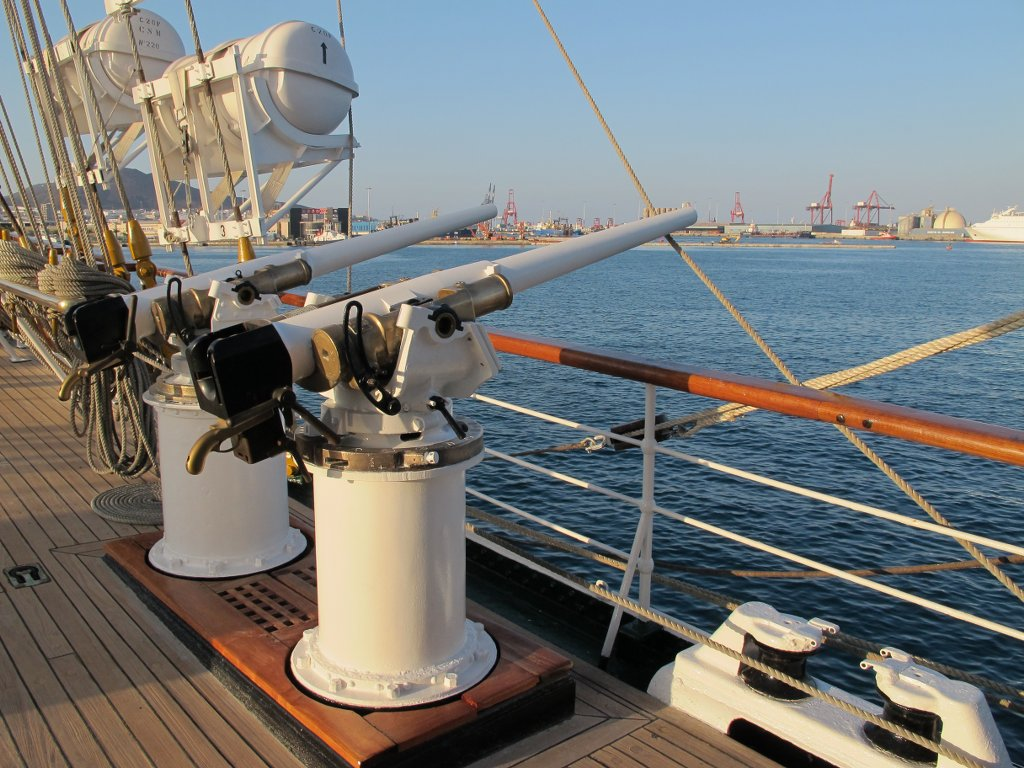
QF 3 pounder Hotchkiss cannons

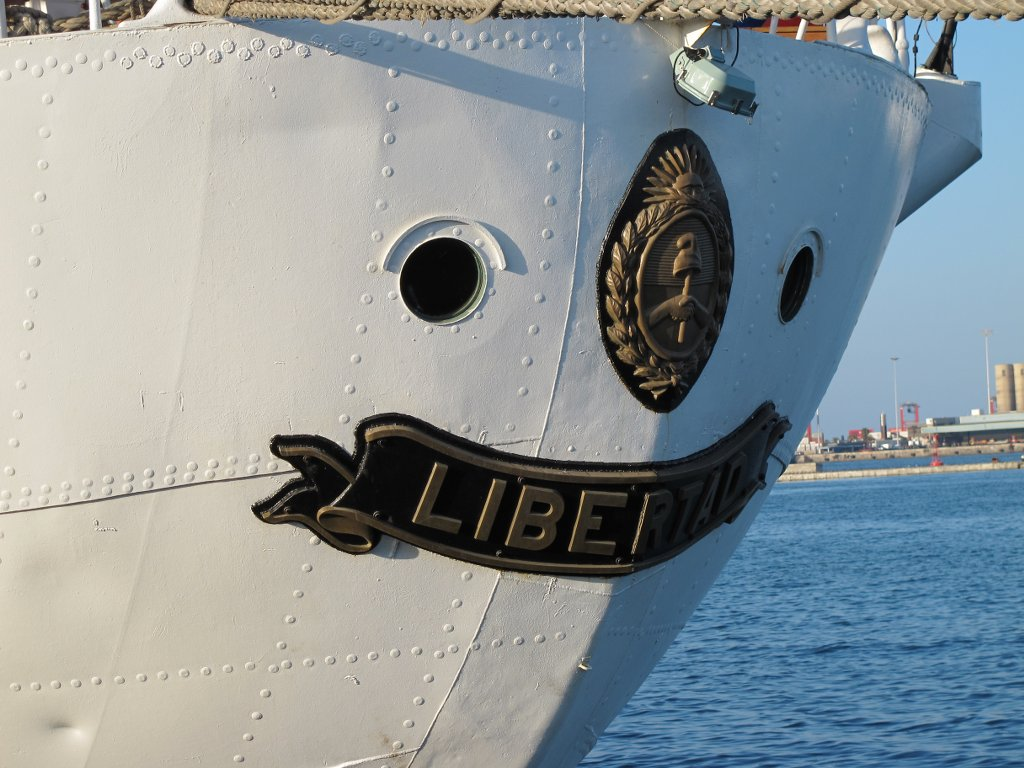
Aft detail, highlighting the bronze coat of arms of Argentina

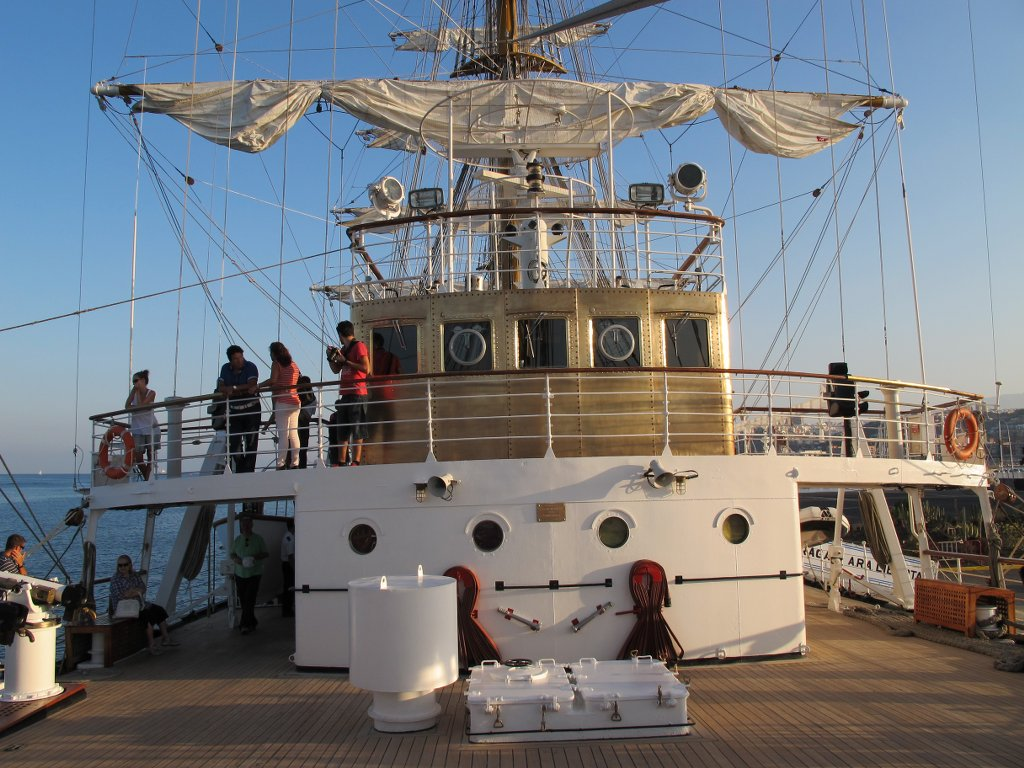
Bridge overview

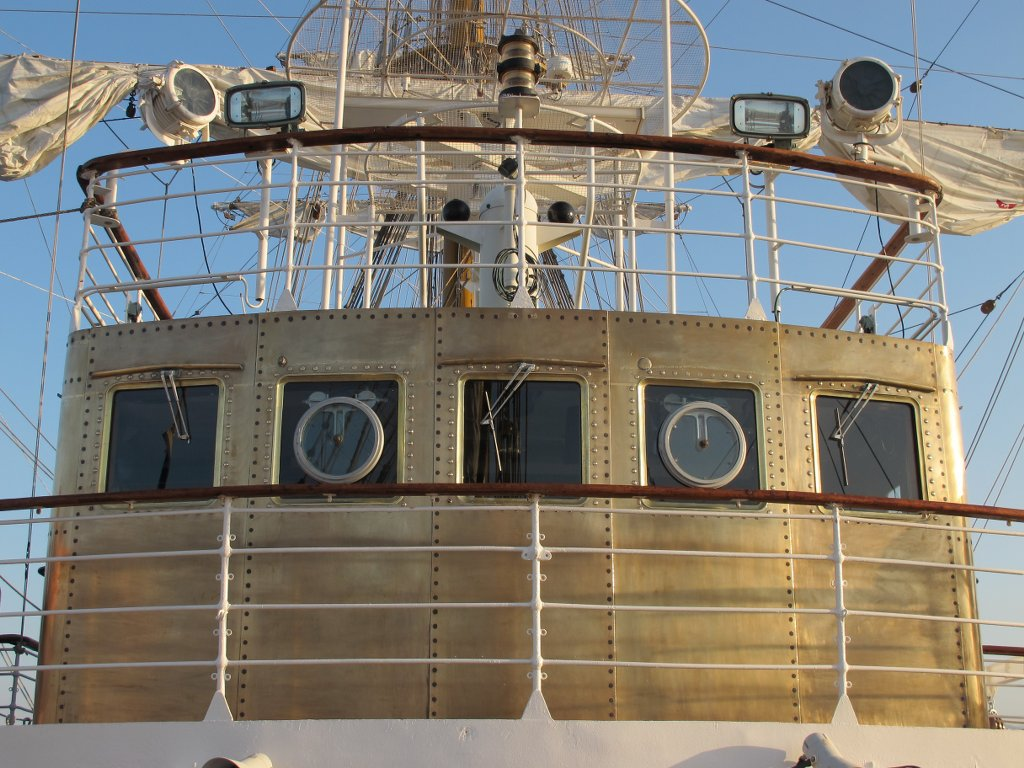
Bridge closeup

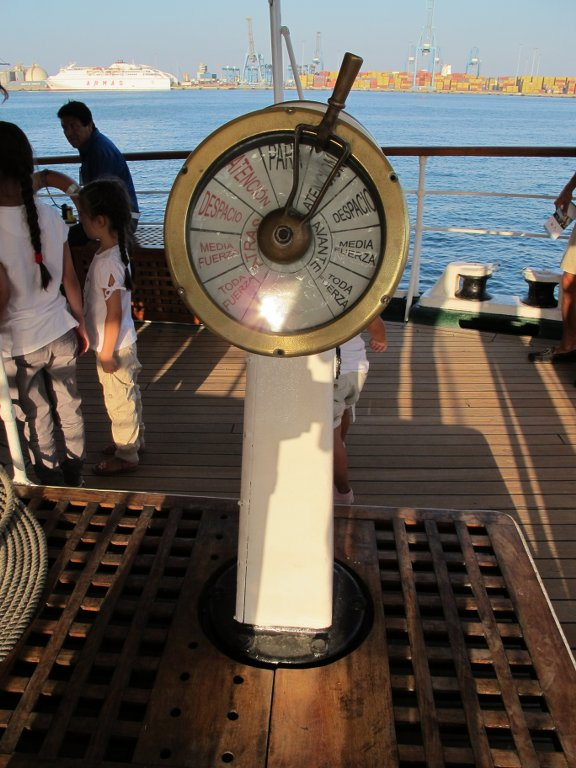
Engine order telegraph control

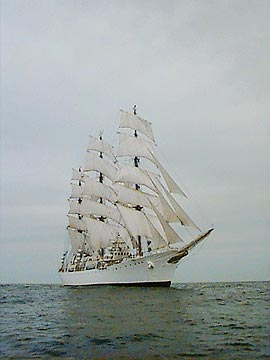
In full sail

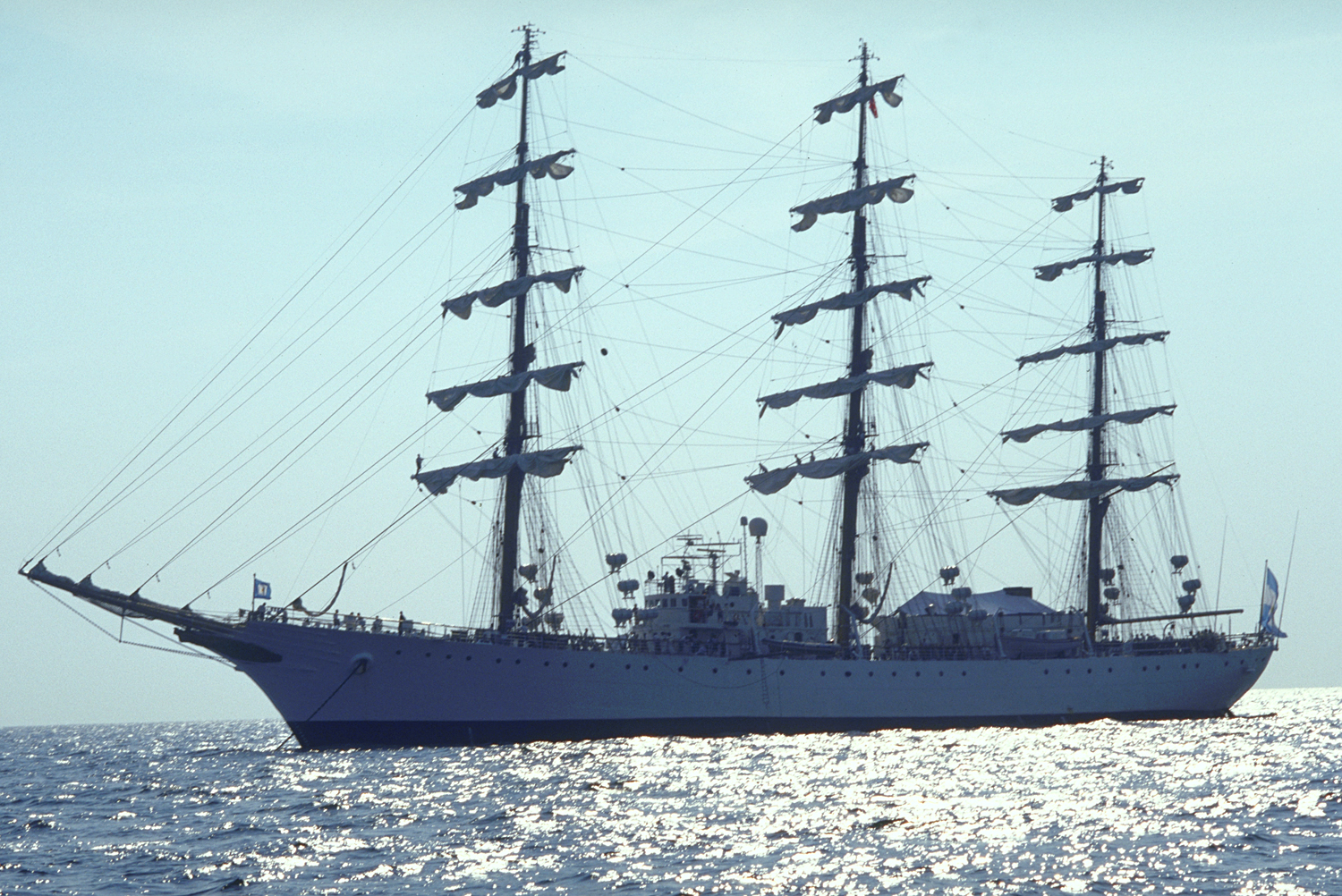
Anchored off the coast of Tybee Island, Georgia, in July 1998

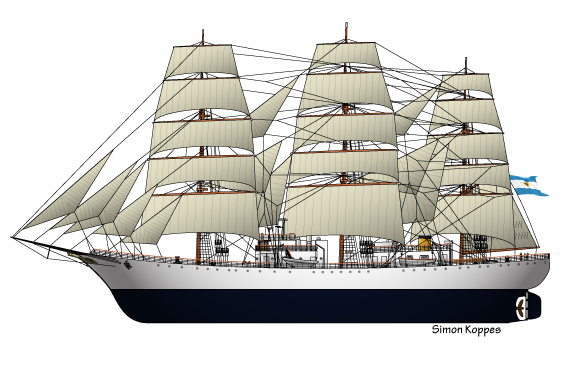
Line art of the ARA Libertad

== See also ==
- List of large sailing vessels
