= Cisne Branco =

Brazilian Navy Sail-training Yacht

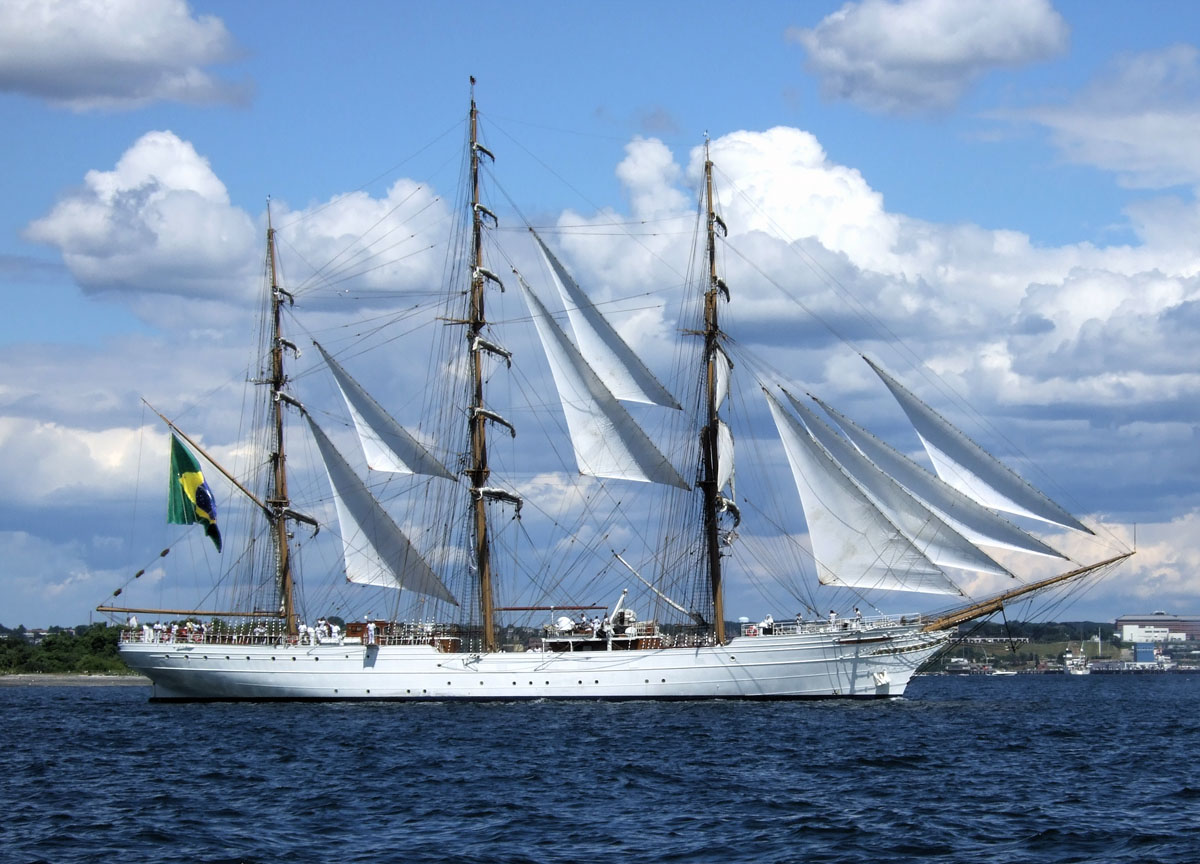
- Cisne Branco

History

Brazil
- Name: Cisne Branco
- Namesake: English: "White Swan"
- Operator: Brazilian Navy
- Builder: Damen Shipyard
- Laid down: 1998
- Launched: 4 August 1999
- Homeport: Rio de Janeiro
- Identification: IMO number: 9203320; MMSI number: 710428000; Callsign: PWCB
- Status: Active

General characteristics
- Type: Training tall ship
- Length: 76 m (249 ft 4 in)
- Beam: 10 m (32 ft 10 in)
- Height: 46 m (150 ft 11 in)
- Draught: 4 m (13 ft 1 in)
- Speed: 11 knots (20 km/h; 13 mph) max on engine; 17.5 knots (32.4 km/h; 20.1 mph) sail
- Crew: 72

Cisne Branco is a tall ship of the Brazilian Navy, based at Rio de Janeiro, Brazil, used for diplomatic and public relations operations worldwide. Her name means "white swan." A full-rigged ship, she was built in Amsterdam, Netherlands by Damen Shipyard. Her keel was laid on 9 November 1998, and she was christened and launched on 4 August 1999, delivered to the Brazilian Navy on 4 February 2000. The vessel was commissioned as a Brazilian naval vessel on 9 March 2000. Its sister ship is Stad Amsterdam.

== Previous vessels of the same name ==
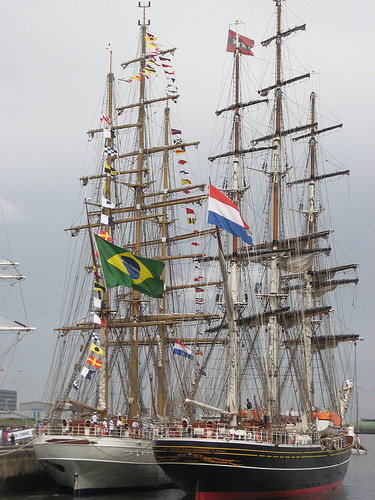
Cisne Branco and her sister ship, Stad Amsterdam.

Cisne Branco is the third Brazilian Navy sail-training yacht to carry this famous name. The first Cisne Branco was the classic 15-metre (49 ft) wooden yacht Tritonia, which was designed by the legendary naval architect Alfred Mylne, and built by Alexander Robertson & Sons in 1910. The yacht arrived in Brazil in 1978, and after extensive repairs undertook an extended 8-month voyage across the Atlantic. The second Cisne Branco (25 m, 83 ft), which had an aluminium hull, was used by the navy between 1980 and 1986 after which it was passed on to a naval college.

== Career ==
Cisne Branco made her maiden voyage across the Atlantic Ocean to Brazil, celebrating the 500th anniversary of the discovery of Brazil by the Portuguese Admiral Pedro Álvares Cabral. The ship's project is inspired by the design of the 19th century clippers. Cisne Branco is normally used in national and international representation activities to showcase the Brazilian Navy and Brazilian culture. As well, she is used as an instructional sailing ship by the cadets of the Brazilian Naval School, Academy of Merchant Marine, and other naval schools.

In 2010 she participated in Velas Sudamerica 2010, a historical Latin American tour by eleven tall ships to celebrate the bicentennial of the first national governments of Argentina and Chile.

On 18 October 2021 Cisne Branco collided with and got stuck under a pedestrian bridge connecting Guayaquil, Ecuador to Santay Island, Ecuador while departing the city. The vessel was stuck while operating with tugboat assistance to pass the drawbridge, being dragged by strong current. The river flux was understated by a local pilot, the foremast was broken and one small tug sank. Cisne Branco was freed a half hour later by tugs and returned to Guayaquil to be inspected for damage.

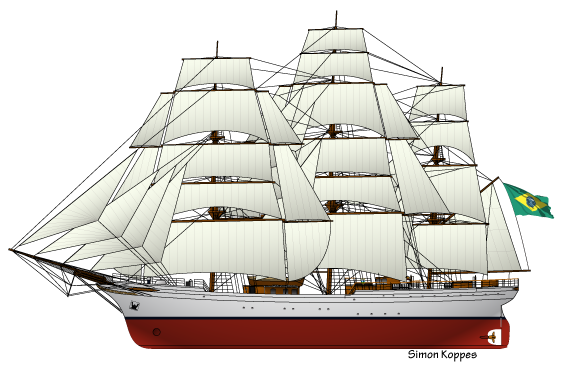
Line art of Cisne Branco

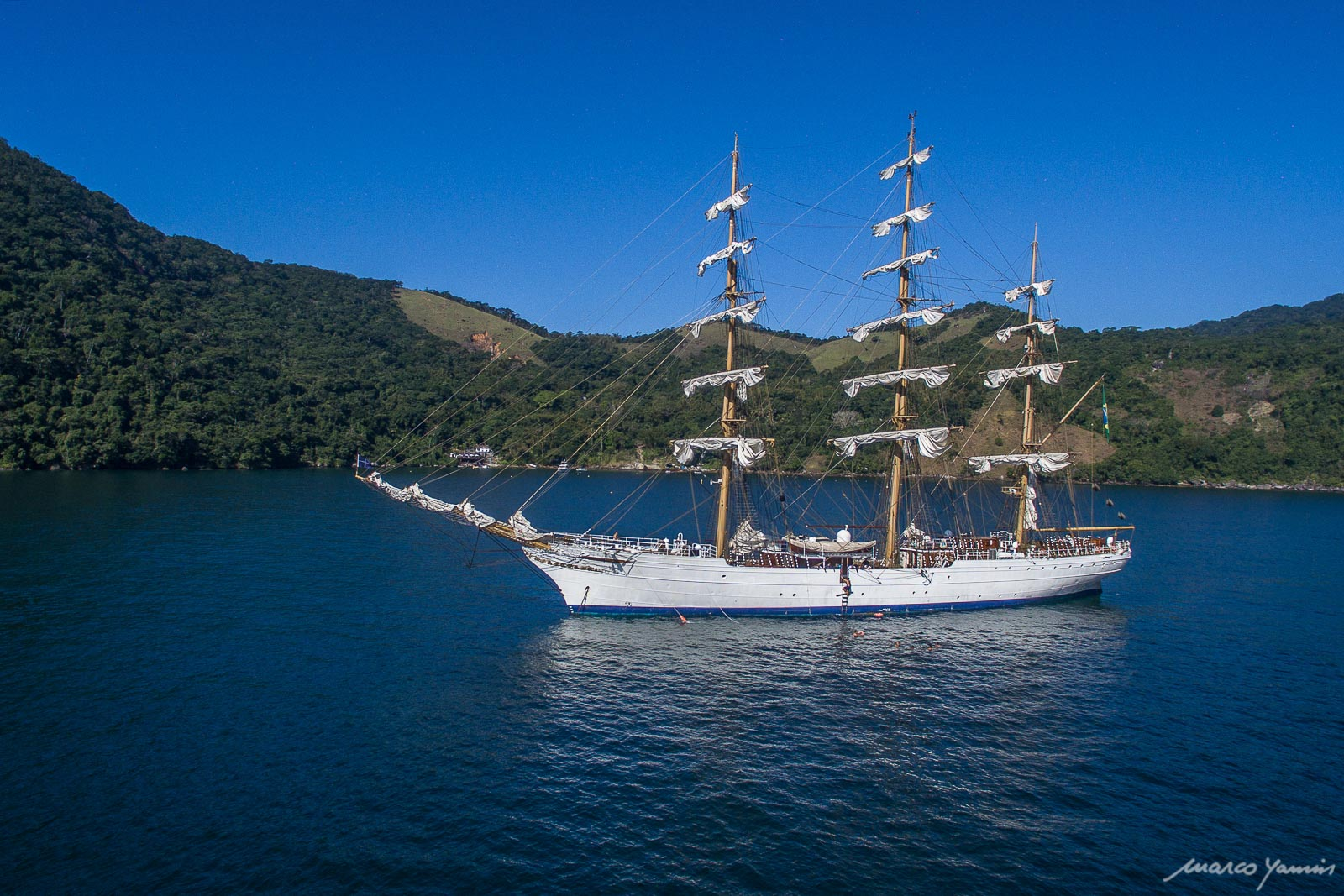

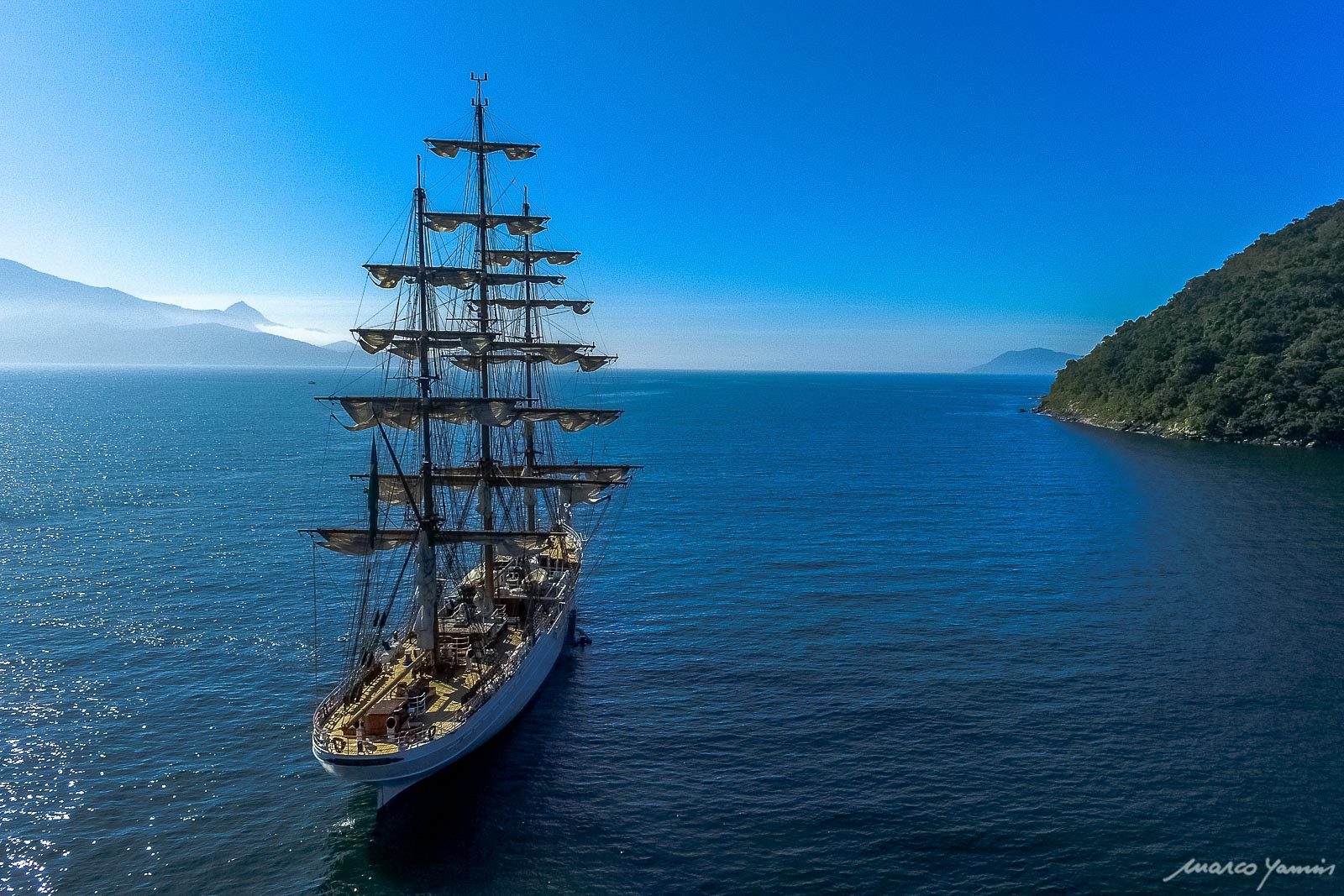

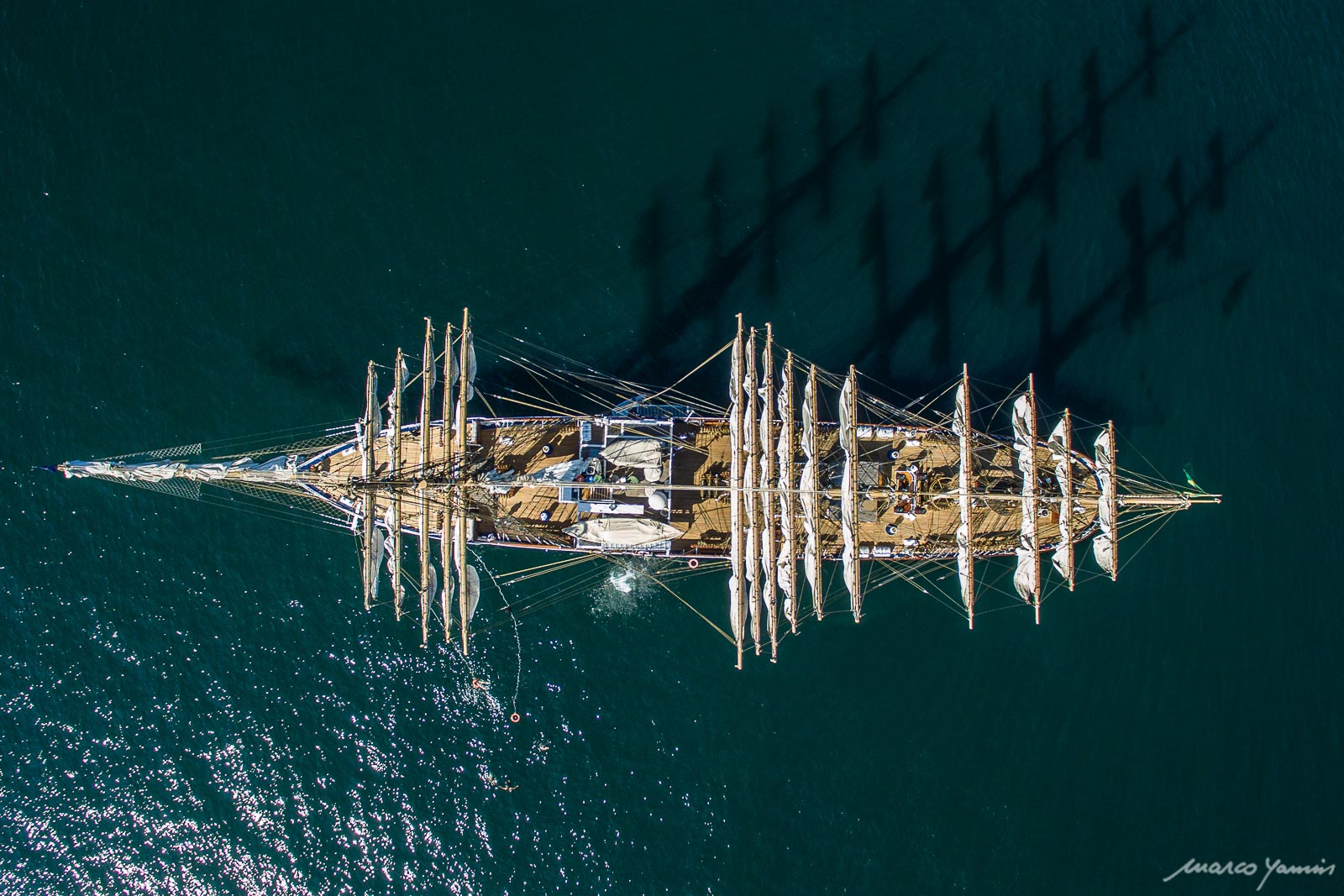

== See also ==
- Benjamin Constant (Brazilian training ship), also known as the Cisne Branco.
