= Casa Nacional del Bicentenario =

Cultural center and museum in Buenos Aires, Argentina

Coordinates: 34°35′51.3″S 58°23′40.5″W

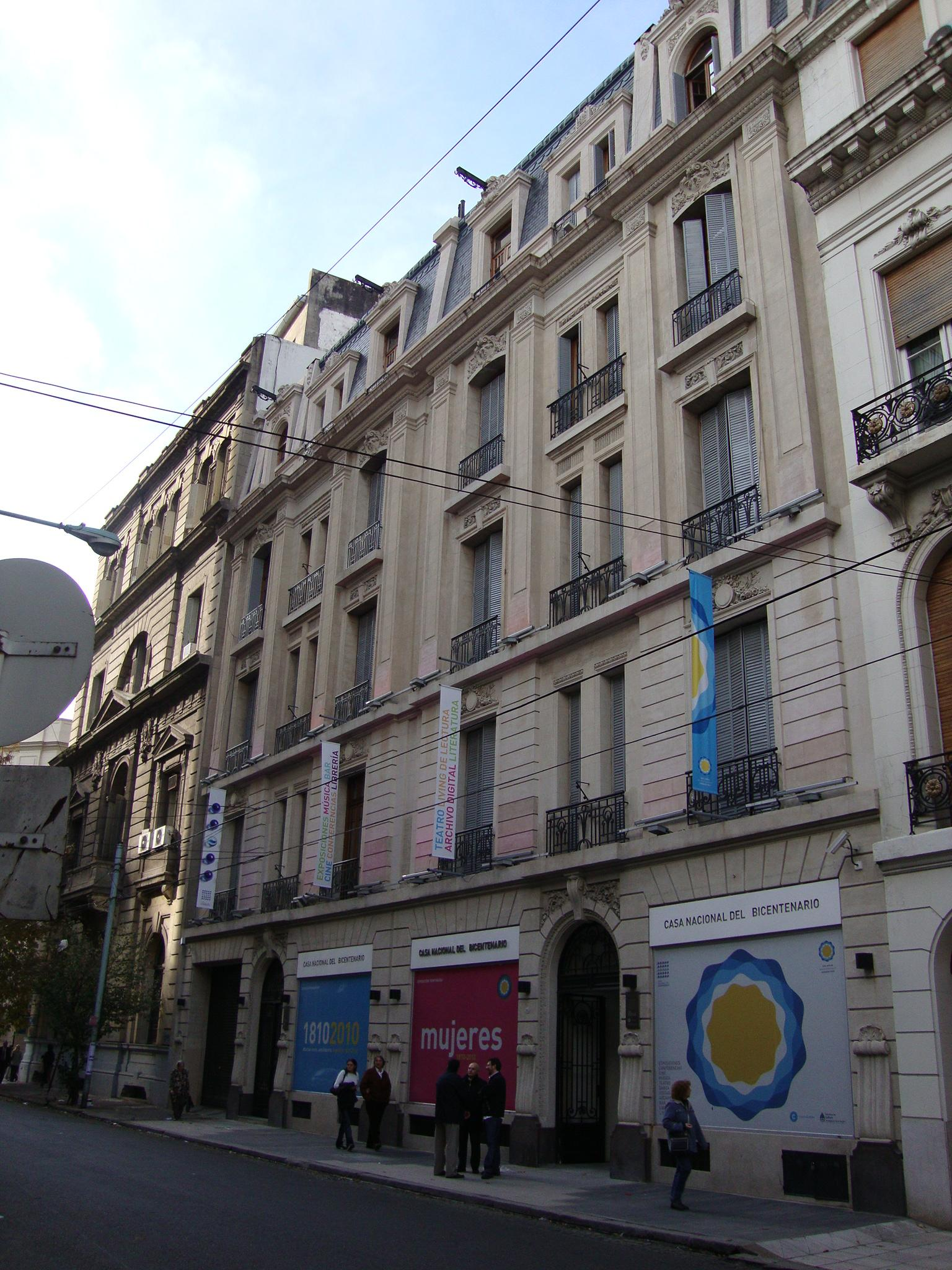
Casa Nacional del Bicentenario

The Casa Nacional del Bicentenario ("National Bicentennial House") is a cultural center and museum located in the Recoleta section of Buenos Aires, Argentina.

== Overview ==
The proposal for the center as such was developed by the office of the Secretary of Culture during the administration of President Néstor Kirchner, led at the time by José Nun. Nun obtained a grant from the Spanish Embassy of € 300,000 toward the project, and work began in 2006 to remodel the eclecticist French baroque building designated for the purpose. The apartment building, completed in 1913, was purchased by the former state water and sanitation concern, OSN, in 1937 for use as housing for its administrative employees in Buenos Aires.

Following OSN's privatization, the building was transferred the National Culture Secretariat in 1996, and until 2001, was slated to house the National Museum of Asian Art (which, since 1965, has occupied the bottom floor of the National Museum of Decorative Arts). The building was made part of a series of projects to honor the Bicentennial of the May Revolution of 1810, and following refurbishment works and installations costing around US$1.7 million, was formally inaugurated as the National Bicentennial House by President Cristina Kirchner on March 16, 2010.

Located on 985 Riobamba Street, one block west of upscale Callao Avenue, the 3,500 m^{2} (38,000 ft²) center includes a historical library, a continuous video display, Muchas voces, una historia. Argentina 1810–2010 (Many Voices, One Story), an open-air theatre, temporary exhibit halls, digitalized archives, and a production studies for Encuentro, an educational television channel operated by Argentine Public Television.

The center's maiden exhibit, Mujeres. 1810–2010, was dedicated to the historical role of women in Argentina.
