= Historias de corceles y de acero =

- Author: Daniel Balmaceda
- Publisher: SUDAMERICANA
- Publication date: 2010
- ISBN: 9789500733892

Historias de corceles y de acero is an Argentine book written by Daniel Balmaceda in 2010, in the context of the Argentina Bicentennial. The main topic is the Argentine War of Independence, but rather than being written as a history book it provides trivial information about the peoples involved in it, specific anecdotes or related information. The author explained in the prologue that "The history of the nation is more humane than we usually imagine".

The name of the book comes from a line of the March of San Lorenzo.
