= ARA Libertad =

Several ships of the Argentine Navy have been named ARA Libertad (or Libertad before the 1860s):

- Libertad (1827), a brigantine that served as corsair
- Libertad (1841), a schooner
- Libertad (1845), a schooner
- Libertad (1853), a whaler that served in the war between Buenos Aires and the Argentine Confederation
- Libertad (1861), a steamship that served in the war between Buenos Aires and the Argentine Confederation
- Libertad (1865), a steamship that served in the war against Paraguay
- ARA Libertad (1892), a coastal battleship, in service with the Argentine Navy from 1892 to 1947
- Libertad (1955), an auxiliary cruiser formerly a transport ship named Eva Peron
- ARA Libertad (Q-2), a sailing frigate launched in 1956, currently in service as training ship with the Argentine Navy
