= Argentina Bicentennial =

2010 celebrations commemorating the 200th anniversary of the May Revolution in Argentina

Official logo of the celebration.

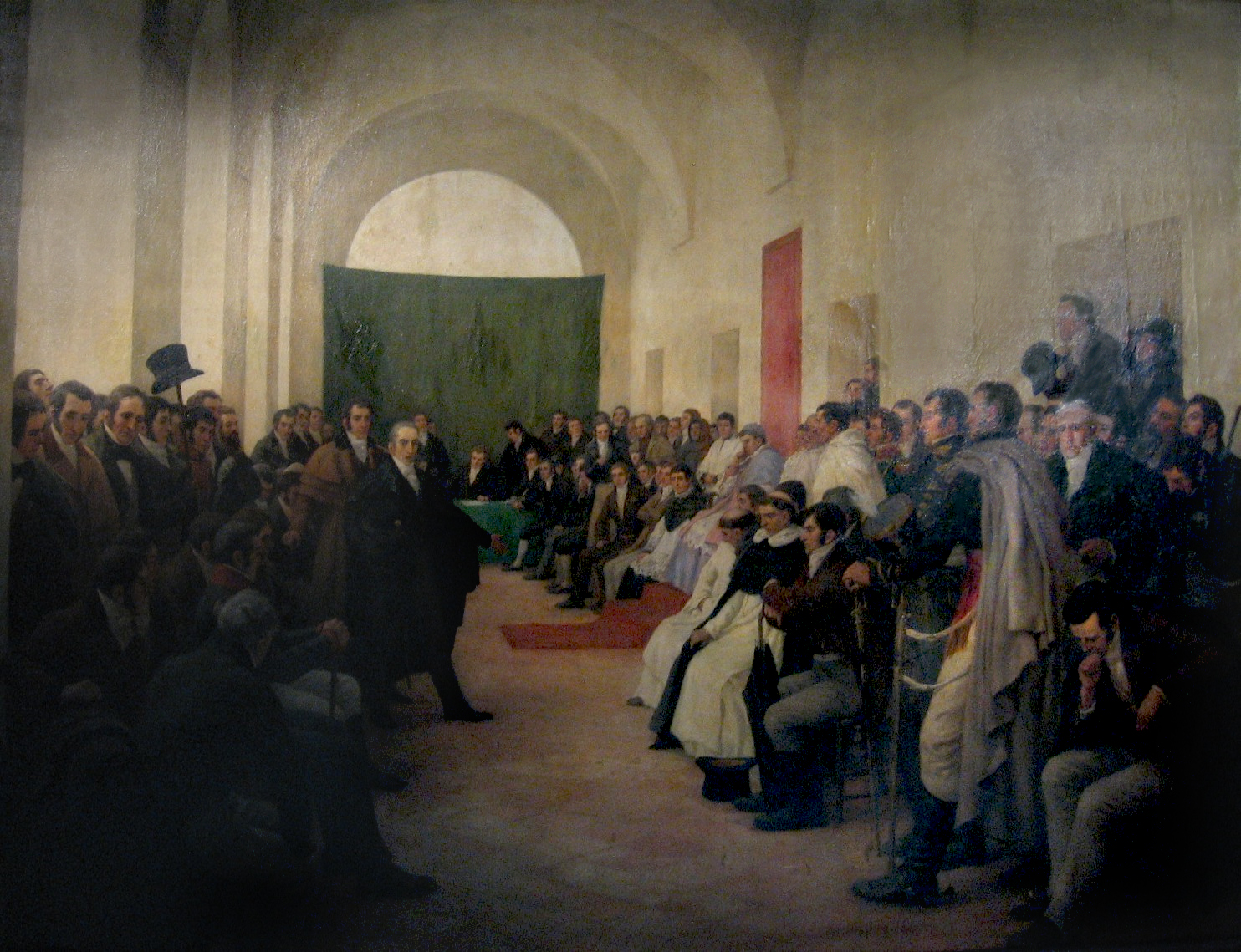
The Argentina Bicentennial commemorates the 200 years of the May Revolution.

The Argentina Bicentennial (Spanish: bicentenario argentino) was a series of ceremonies, festivals, and observances celebrated on May 25, 2010, and throughout the year. They commemorated the 200th anniversary of the May Revolution, a sequence of historical events that led to the Viceroy Baltasar Hidalgo de Cisneros being ousted from office and replaced with the Primera Junta, the first national government.

Bicentennial celebrations began on Friday, May 21 in Buenos Aires, with millions of people in attendance, making them the biggest outdoor festivities Argentina had seen since it celebrated its return to democratic rule after seven years of military dictatorship in 1983.

== Background and leading events ==
Celebrations for the bicentennial started early in 2010 and continued through the year. These events were not related solely to the May Revolution, but also to many factors pertaining to the history and culture of Argentina.

It started on January 20 with the Cosquín Festival, a yearly folk music event which lasts for 12 days. The armies of Argentina and Chile recreated the crossing of the Andes, led in 1817 by José de San Martín, Bernardo O'Higgins, and the Army of the Andes, on January 28. Many historical events of Argentina were performed on a stage in Mar del Plata on February 10, with more than 600 actors, and an audience of more than 100,000 people.

At the beginning of May, President Cristina Fernández de Kirchner signed a decree declaring May 24 a holiday, but only during 2010.

== Main events ==
=== Buenos Aires ===
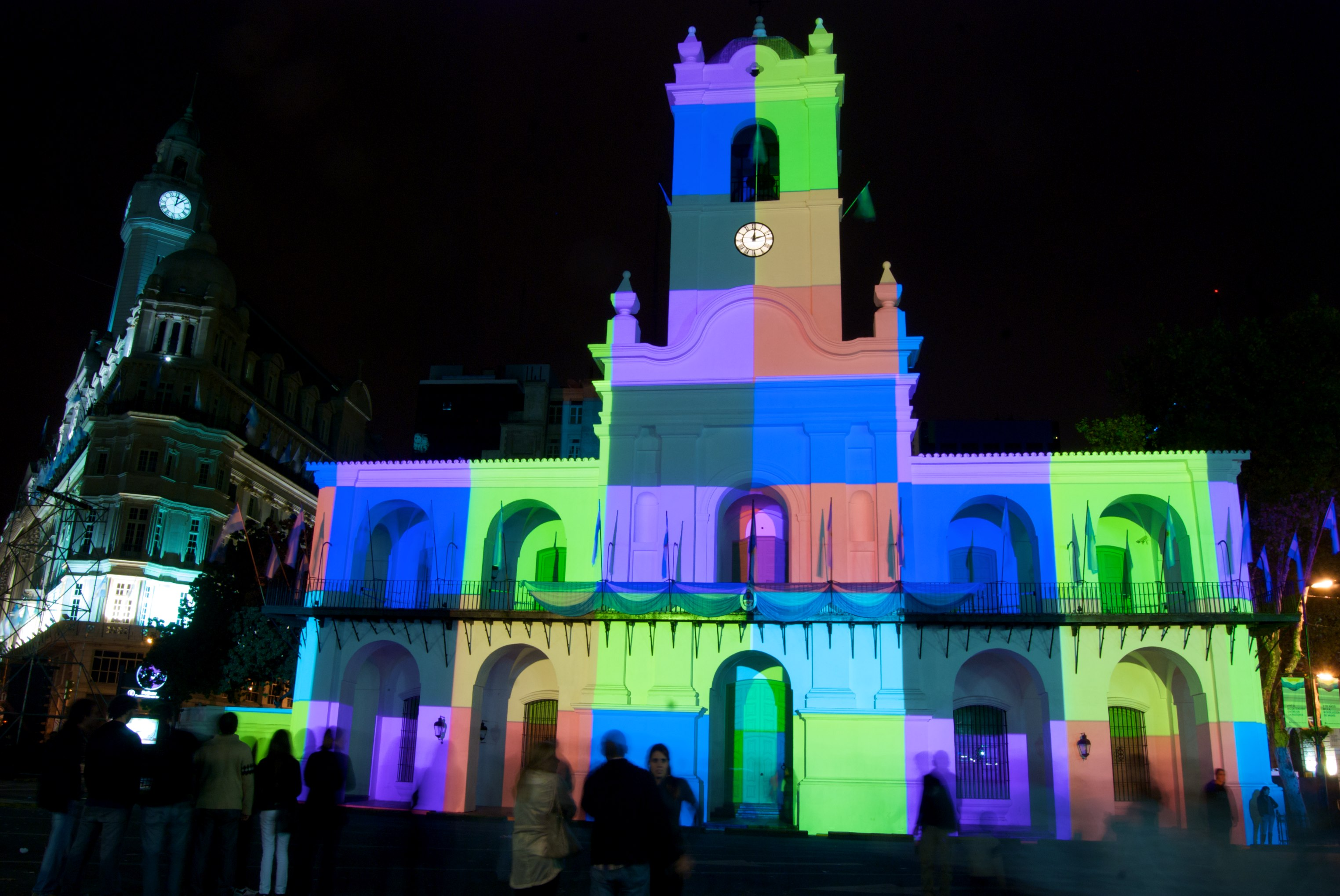
The Buenos Aires Cabildo, site of the May 25, 1810, proclamation, is festooned in lights for the bicentennial.

The 9 de Julio Avenue was closed to the traffic between Corrientes and Belgrano avenues during the festivity days, and was used to host the main celebrations. Celebrations started on May 21, with a concert of Argentine rock bands. Litto Nebbia acted as host, and performers included Fito Páez and León Gieco. Temporary installations on the avenue were complemented by the earlier opening of the interactive National Bicentennial House, in the Recoleta section of the city, and of the initial phase of the Bicentennial Cultural Center, in the former Buenos Aires Central Post Office; the cultural center was scheduled to be completed in 2012.

A number of military parades of modern and historical regiments and units, including the Regiment of Patricians and the Regiment of Mounted Grenadiers, were staged on May 22. They were followed by parades representing the provinces of Argentina and their local cultures; for instance, Jujuy included llamas and Córdoba included a traditional cuarteto band. In the night there was a concert of Latin American music, hosted by León Gieco and with the presence of Uruguayan Jaime Roos, Brazilian Gilberto Gil, Víctor Heredia, Gustavo Santaolalla, Colombian Totó la Momposina, Mundo Alas, and Cuban Pablo Milanés.

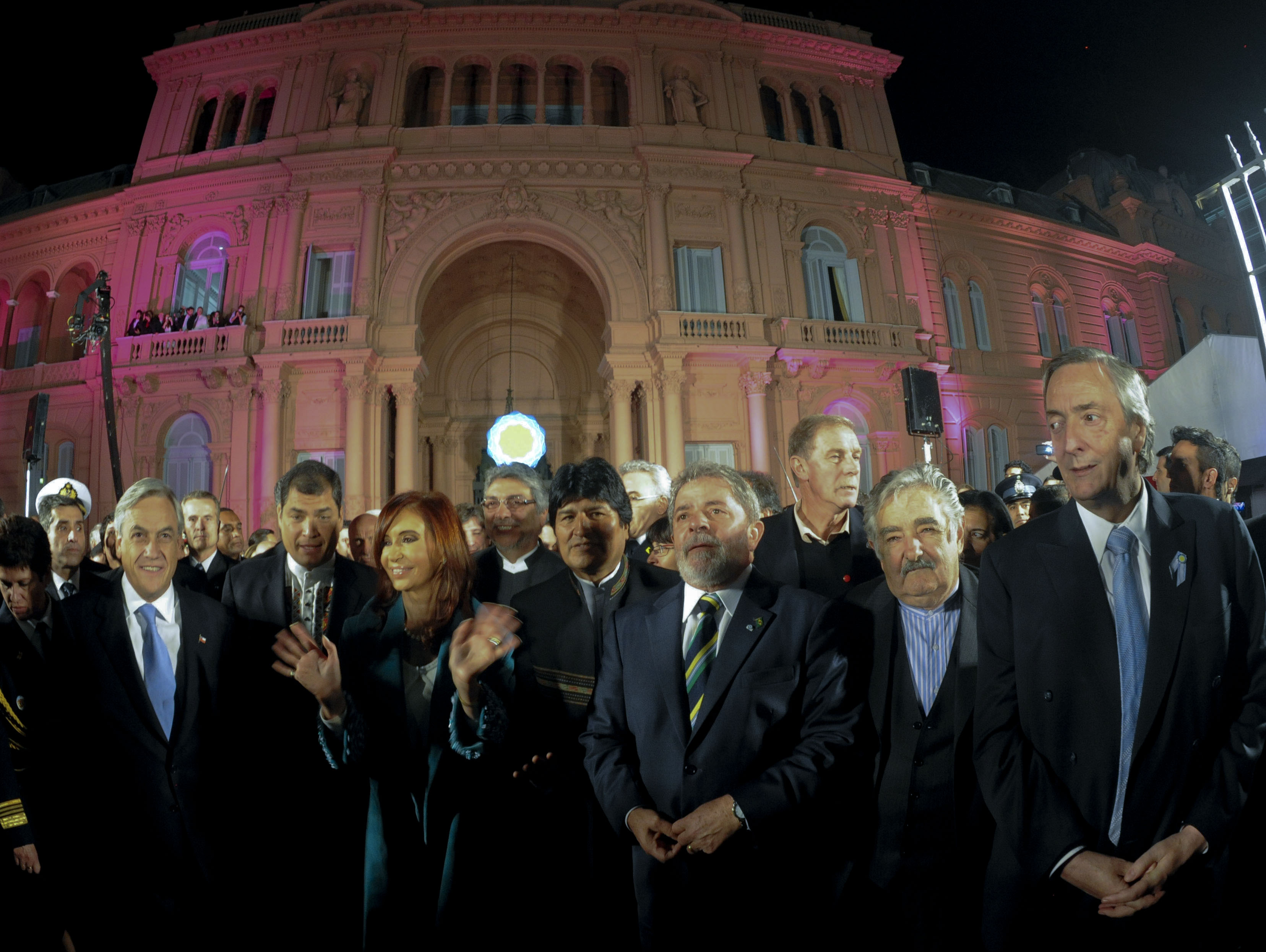
South American presidents at the celebrations. From left to right: President Sebastián Piñera of Chile, President Rafael Correa of Ecuador, President Cristina Fernández de Kirchner of Argentina, President Fernando Lugo of Paraguay, President Evo Morales of Bolivia, President Lula da Silva of Brazil, President Pepe Mujica of Uruguay, and UNASUR Secretary-General Néstor Kirchner.

Presidents Luiz Inácio Lula da Silva of Brazil, Sebastián Piñera of Chile, José Mujica of Uruguay, Hugo Chávez of Venezuela, Rafael Correa of Ecuador, Fernando Lugo of Paraguay, and Evo Morales of Bolivia, and former presidents Manuel Zelaya of Honduras and Martín Torrijos of Panama arrived in Buenos Aires for the closing parade.

=== Córdoba ===
The city of Córdoba prepared the Expo 200 Bicentenario fair. Held at the Complejo Ferial Córdoba, it opened on May 22 and featured more than 300 stands from the productive, industrial, touristic, cultural, and technological sectors of the province. The convention included many scheduled events, seminars, parades, conferences, and musical, cultural, and gastronomic spectacles.

The city of Villa María prepared the largest dish of locro in the world, served for free to 10,000 people.

=== Rosario ===
The city of Rosario started the celebrations on May 22 at the National Flag Memorial, which was covered with blue and white, as the flag of Argentina. It made an opera concert under the slogan of "founding the second Argentina", and the tenor Darío Volonté invited the people to sing "Aurora". There were also works to restore the Libertador San Martín theater.

=== San Luis ===
The government of San Luis prepared a replica of the May Square, the Buenos Aires Cabildo, and the May Pyramid, in their 1810 designs. The replica would differ from the Cabildo's present appearance, as urban development in the twentieth century led to the removal of several outside columns to make room for avenues. The project is planned for the town of La Punta, and Governor Alberto Rodríguez Saá intends to keep it as a cultural and educational center.

== Political disputes ==
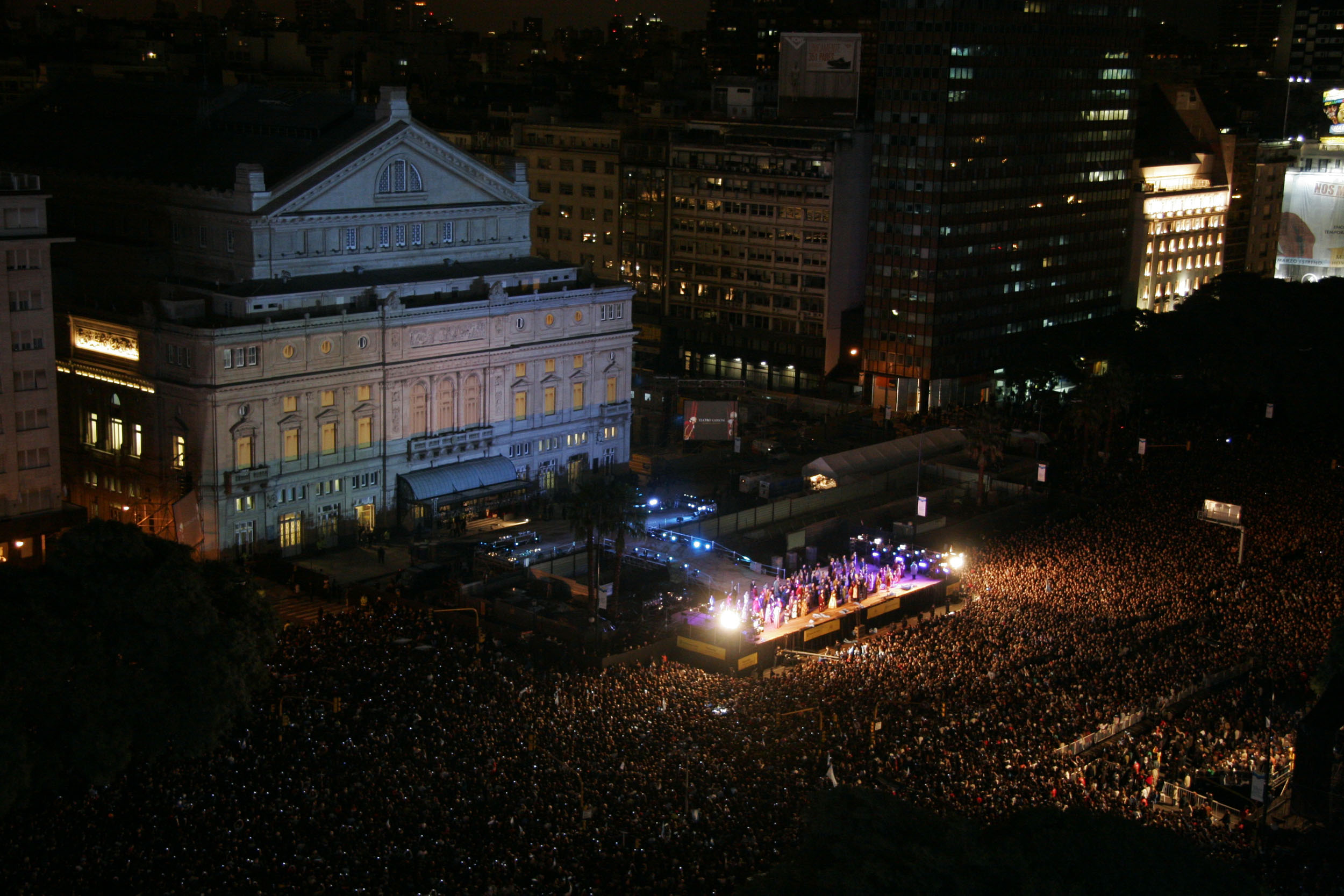
Teatro Colón outdoor show.

The celebrations led to a number of disputes among politicians. Judge Norberto Oyarbide had named the mayor of Buenos Aires, Mauricio Macri, a person of interest in an investigation about a warrantless wiretapping case originally reported in 2009 by Sergio Burnstein, a Jewish activist known for his work in the name of the victims of the 1994 AMIA bombing.

Macri accused Néstor Kirchner and President Cristina Fernández de Kirchner of being behind Oyarbide's action. On May 23, Macri expressed his disgust towards the Kirchners, stating to the media that "if she is coming with her husband, the consort, I will have to sit there". Two days before, Macri also referred pejoratively to the President as "la señora de ahí enfrente" ("the woman across the street"). On May 21, President Cristina Fernández de Kirchner canceled her earlier acceptance of Macri's invitation to the Teatro Colón's May 24 reopening gala. Macri requested that the President reconsider her decision, though without offering apologies for his earlier remark; ultimately, Mrs. Kirchner did not attend the event.

The administration scheduled an honor luncheon at the White Room of the Casa Rosada during the night of May 25. It included nearly 200 guests, among them notable people from the Church, industry, media, culture and sports. Vice President Julio Cobos was not invited, however, due to an ongoing conflict between Cobos and the President stemming from his decision to join the opposition during the 2008 Argentine government conflict with the agricultural sector. Likewise not invited were former Presidents Carlos Menem, Fernando de la Rúa, and Eduardo Duhalde.

== Media and literature ==
The Argentine Bicentennial motivated the making of historical movies such as Revolución: El cruce de los Andes, which recreates the crossing of the Andes, and La Patria Equivocada, that narrates part of the history of Argentina through a family from the time period as witnesses of the events. Manuel Belgrano was another film, focused on the life of the politician and military leader of the same name. In addition, many books related to the topic were published in advance of the event, such as 1810, Enigmas de la historia argentina, Hombres de Mayo, and Historias de corceles y de acero.

== Comparison with the centennial ==
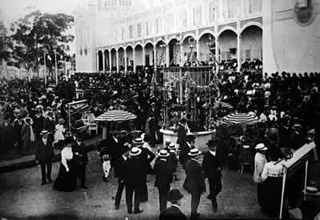
Centennial of the May Revolution, 1910.

A recurring topic of debate in Argentine newspaper editorials was the comparison between the bicentennial and the centennial in 1910. Some authors, such as intellectual Rosendo Fraga, described the centennial as having been better, arguing that Argentina enjoyed a more favorable context when economic measures such as relative GDP per capita, quality of public education, and the public's optimism or its perceived will to improve are considered. The centennial, moreover, took place only two years before the enactment of the Sáenz Peña Law, which helped make universal suffrage effective to all male citizens in Argentina aged 18 and over.

Others, such as historian Felipe Pigna, stated instead that Argentina in 1910 did not compare favorably with Argentina in 2010, when the lack of social legislation and labor laws, as well as the significant wealth gap between the rich and society in general, are taken into account. Pigna argued that praising the centennial would be tantamount to praising the policies that led to and perpetuated such conditions.
