= Tall ship =

Large, traditionally rigged sailing vessel

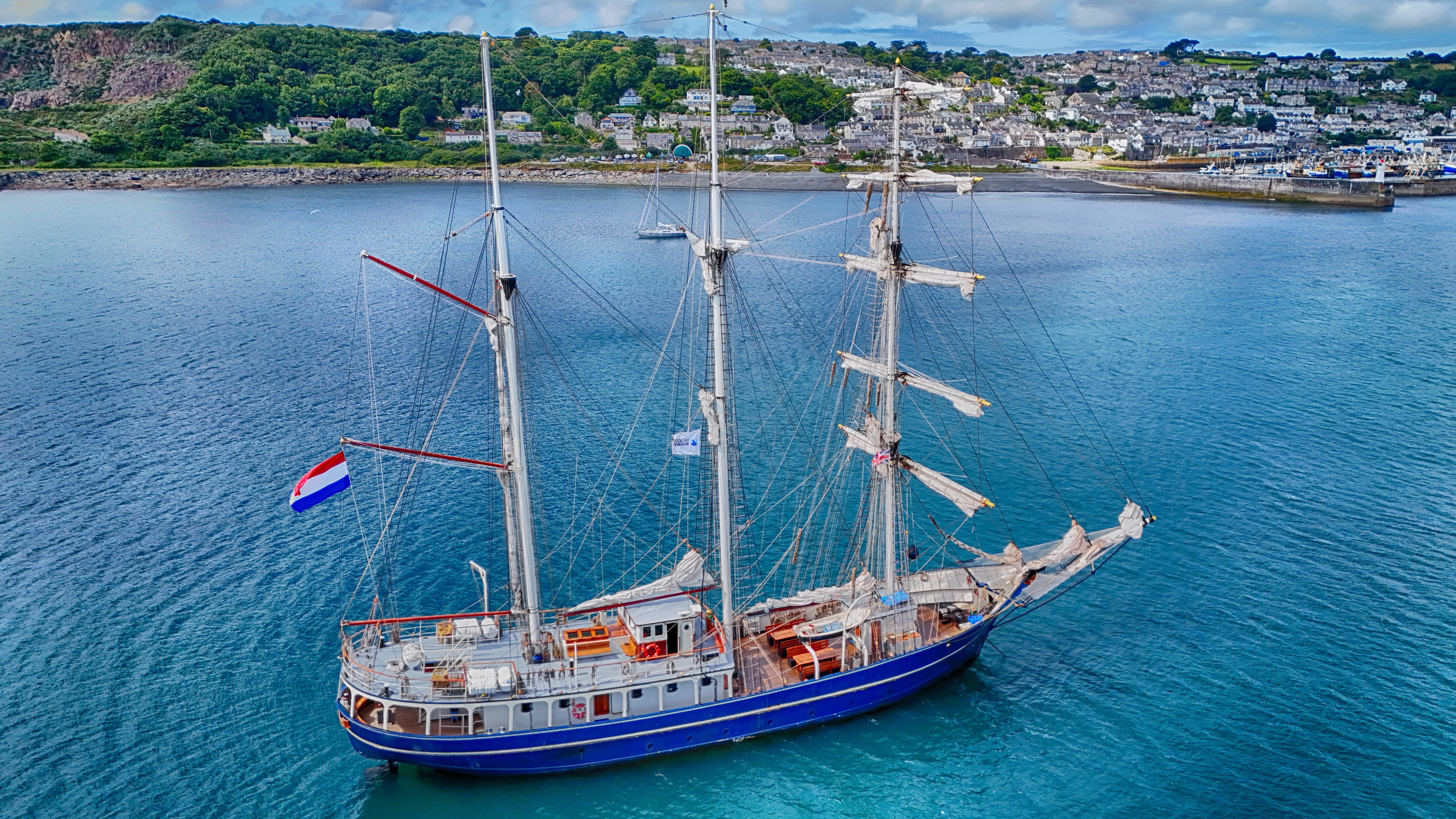
A tall ship from above anchored off of Newlyn in Cornwall

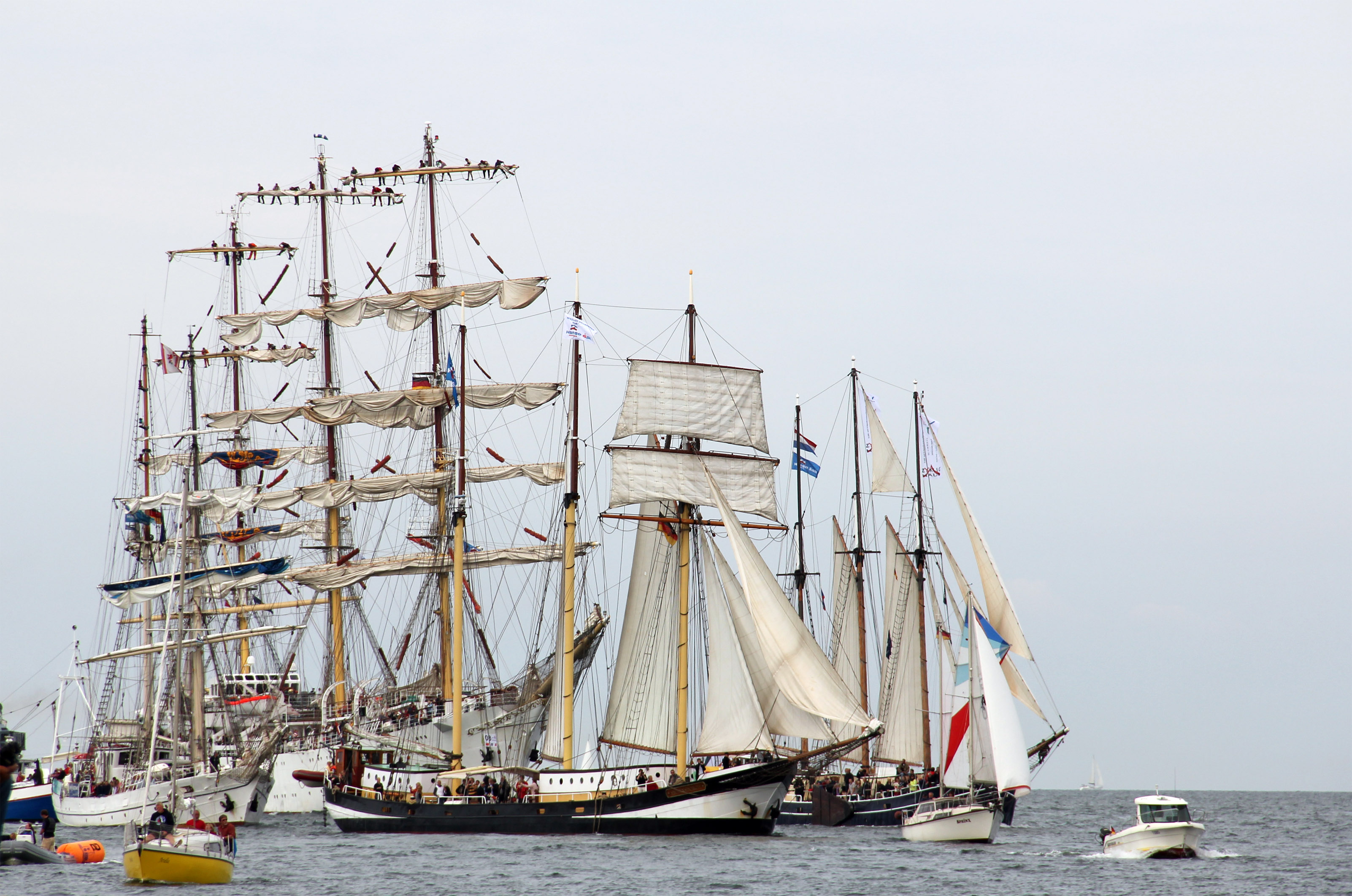
Group of "tall ships" at Hanse Sail 2010

A tall ship is a large, traditionally rigged sailing vessel. Popular modern tall ship rigs include topsail schooners, brigantines, brigs and barques. "Tall ship" can also be defined more specifically by an organization, such as for a race or festival.

== History ==
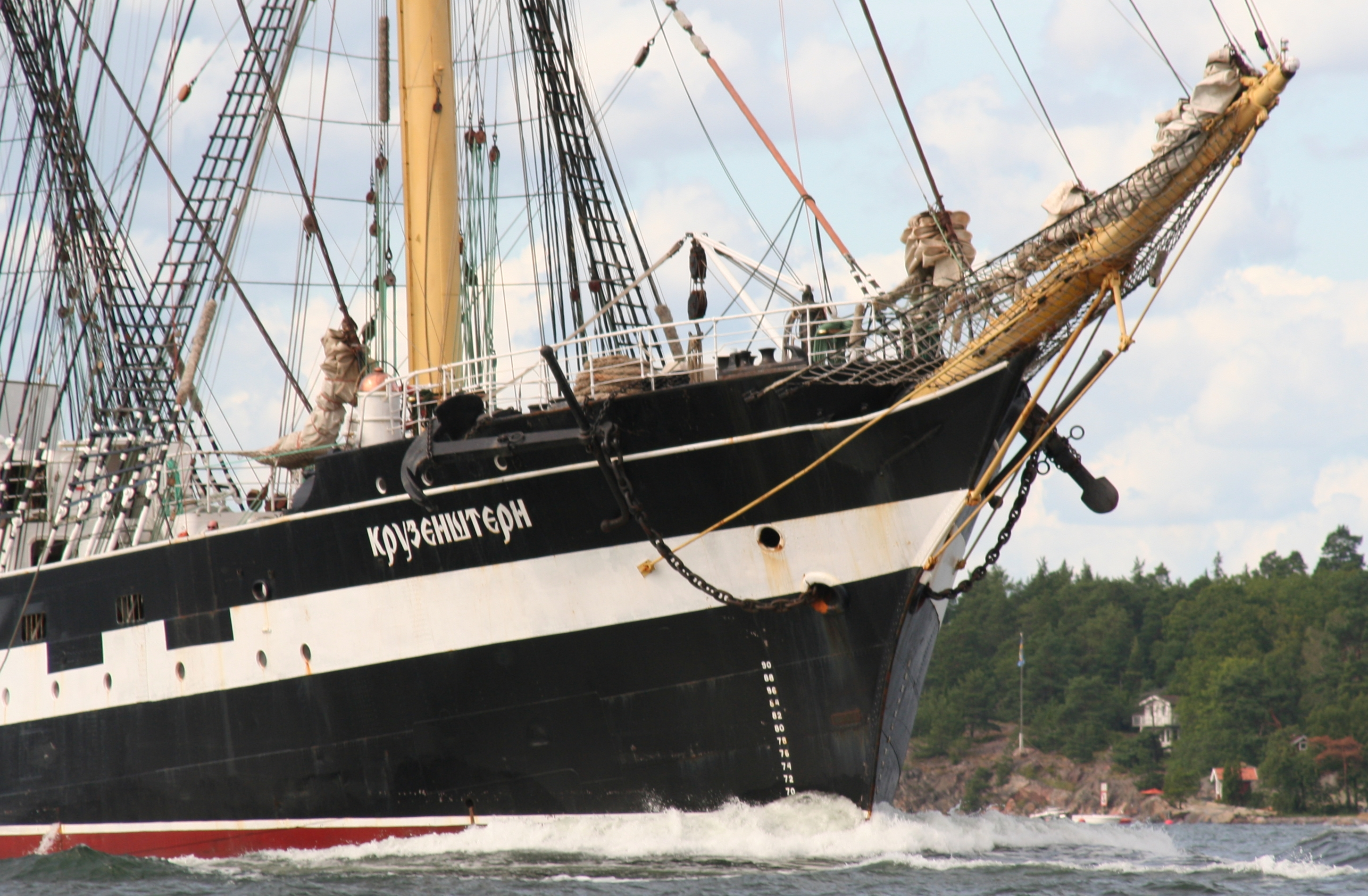
The tall ship Kruzenshtern

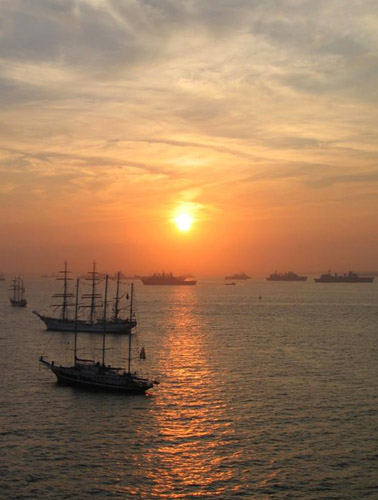
More than 36 tall ships participated in the 200th anniversary of the Battle of Trafalgar in Portsmouth, part of the fleet of 167 naval, merchant and tall ships from 36 countries

Traditional rigging may include square rigs and gaff rigs, also known as fore-and-aft rigs, usually with separate topmasts and topsails. More traditional rigs on larger ships, such as man-o'-war frigates and ships-of-the-line, featured top gallant yards. If it was wished, extra sails called royals could be hoisted to the very top of the masts. It is generally more complex than modern rigging, which utilizes newer materials such as aluminum and steel to construct taller, lightweight masts with fewer, more versatile sails. Most smaller, modern vessels use the Bermuda rig.

Author and master mariner Joseph Conrad (who spent 1874 to 1894 at sea in tall ships and was quite particular about naval terminology) used the term "tall ship" in his works; for example, in The Mirror of the Sea in 1906.

Henry David Thoreau also references the term "tall ship" in his first work, A Week on the Concord and Merrimack Rivers, quoting "Down out at its mouth, the dark inky main blending with the blue above. Plum Island, its sand ridges scolloping along the horizon like the sea-serpent, and the distant outline broken by many a tall ship, leaning, still, against the sky." He does not cite this quotation, but the work was written in 1849.

Sail Training International (STI) has extended the definition of tall ship for the purpose of its races to embrace any sailing vessel with more than 30 ft (9.14 m) waterline length and on which at least half the people on board are aged 15 to 25.

== Sail Training International ==
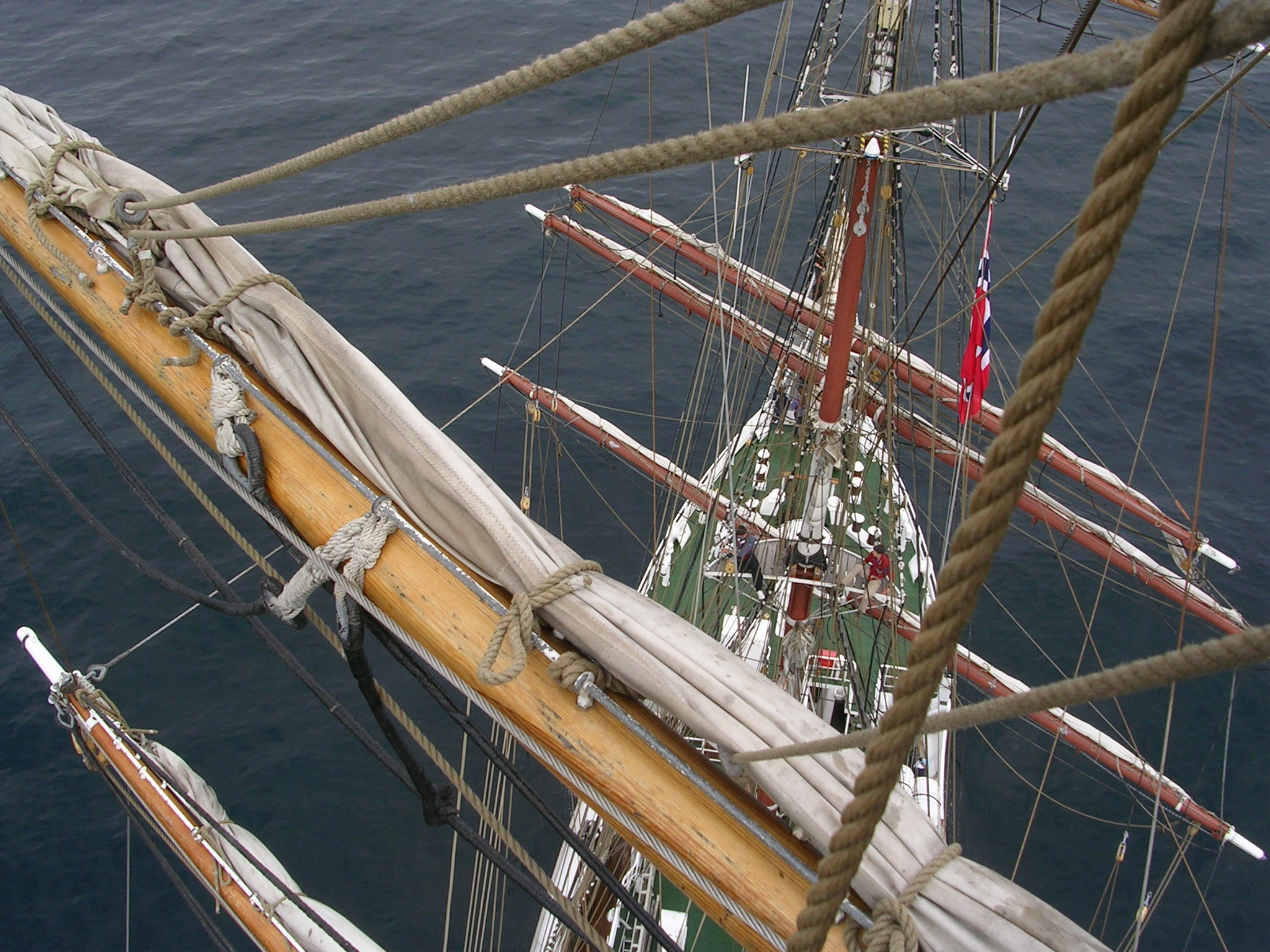
The masts and yards of a brig

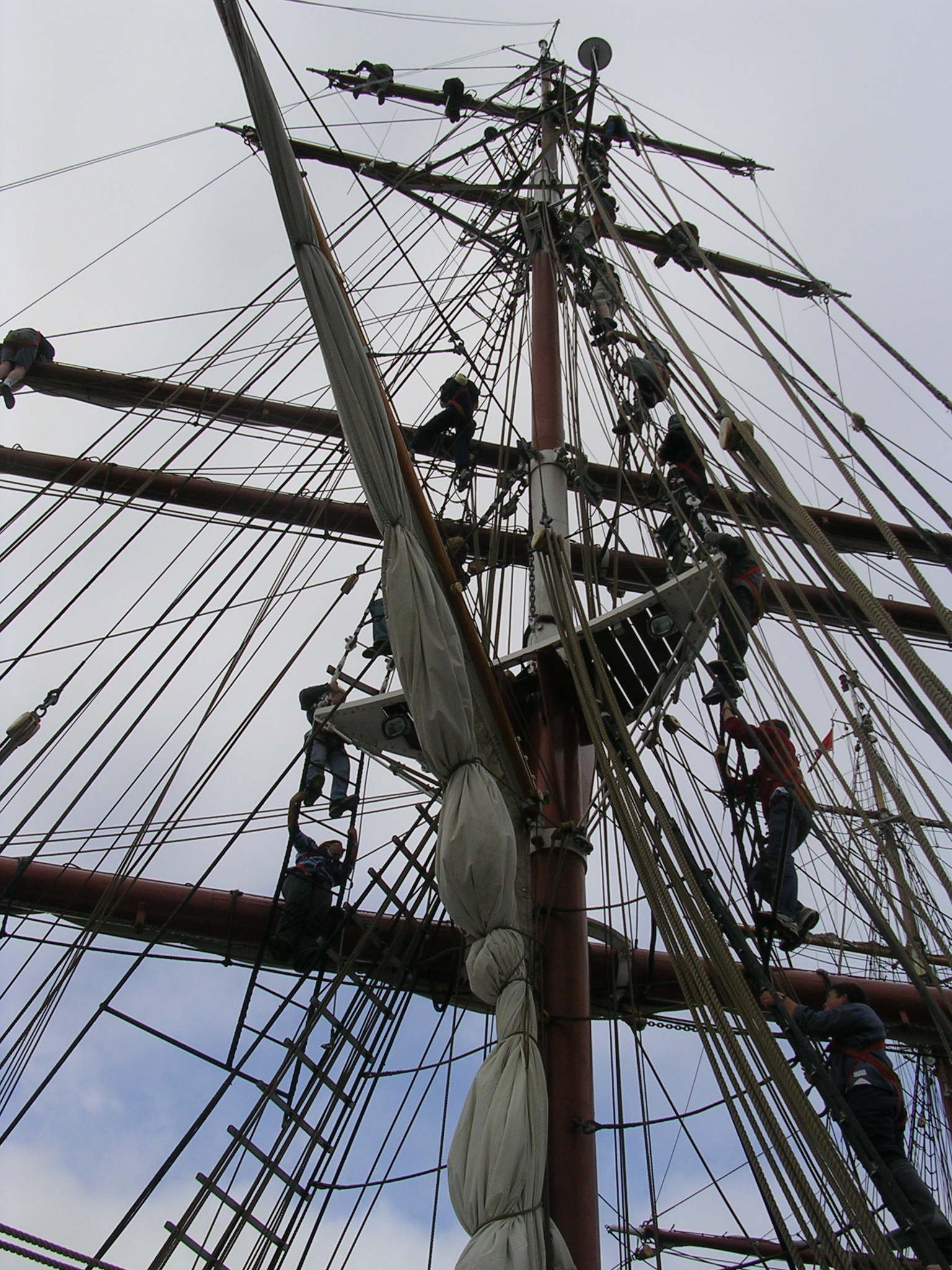
Crew aloft, tending sails

In the 21st century, "tall ship" is often used generically for large, classic, sailing vessels, but is also a technically defined term by Sail Training International for its purposes and STI helped popularize the term. The exact definitions have changed somewhat over time, and are subject to various technicalities, but by 2011 there were 4 classes (A, B, C, and D). There are only two size classes, A is over 40 m LOA, and B/C/D are 9.14 m to under 40 m LOA. The definitions have to do with rigging: class A is for square sail rigged ships, class B is for "traditionally rigged" ships, class C is for "modern rigged" vessels with no "spinnaker-like sails", and class D is the same as class C but carrying a spinnaker-like sail.

=== Class A ===
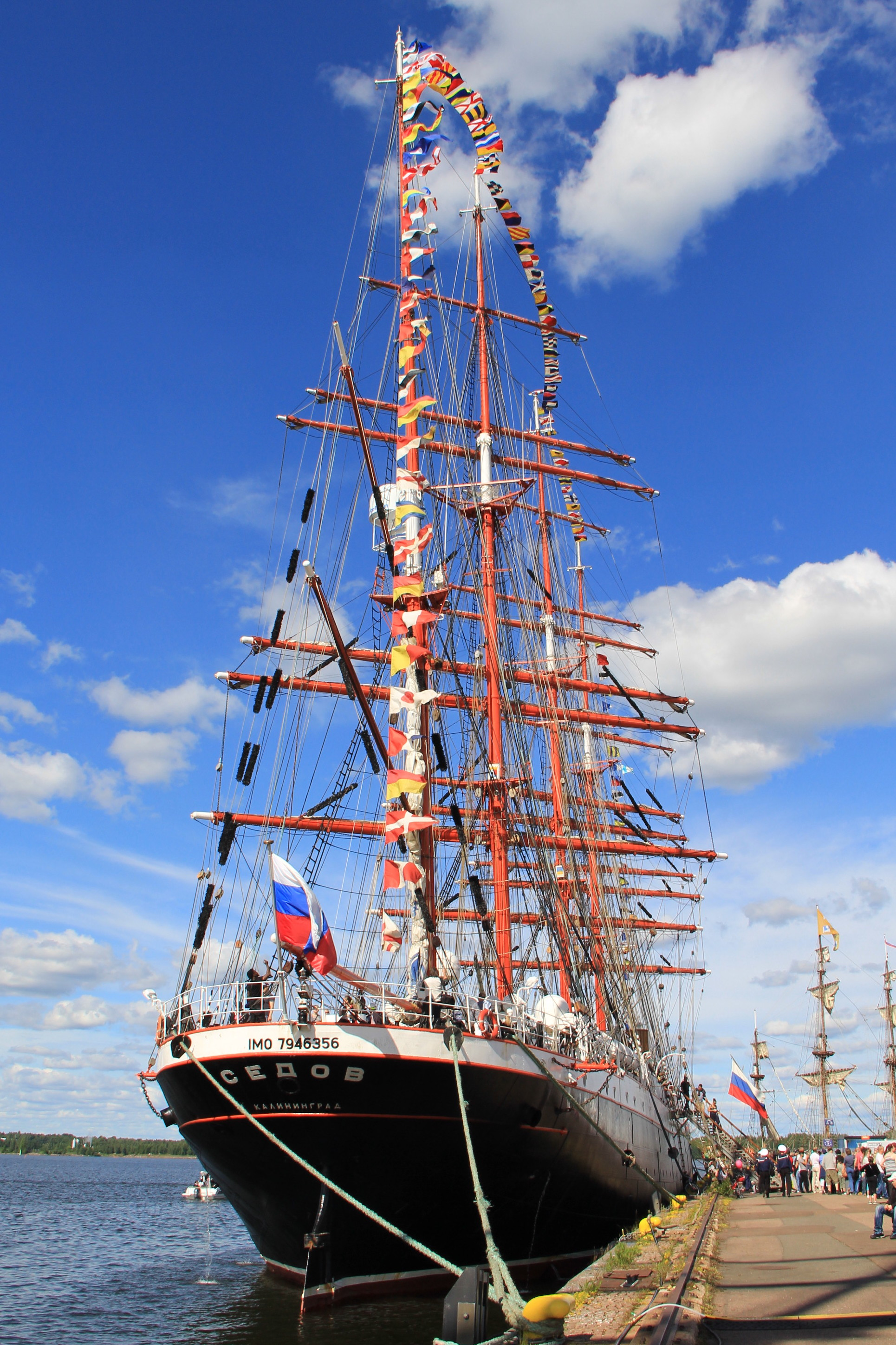
Russian Sedov at the Kantasatama Harbour in Kotka, Finland, during the Tall Ships’ Races 2017

All square-rigged vessels (barque, barquentine, brig, brigantine or ship rigged) and all other vessels more than 40 metres length overall (LOA), regardless of rig. STI classifies its A Class as "all square-rigged vessels and all other vessels over 40 metres (131 ft) length overall (LOA)", in this case STI LOA excludes bowsprit and aft spar. STI defines LOA as "Length overall measured from the fore side of stem post to aft side of stern post, counter or transom".

Class A Tall Ships
Current name	Current nationality	Original delivery	Mast	Rig	Length excluding bowsprit [m]	Beam [m]
Alexander von Humboldt II	Germany	2011	3	Barque	60	10.8
Alpha	Russia	1948	2	Barquentine		8.9
Amerigo Vespucci	Italy	1931	3	Full-rigged ship	82.4	15.8
Belem	France	1896	3	Barque	51	8.8
Bima Suci	Indonesia	2017	3	Barque	111.20	13.65
Capitain Miranda	Uruguay	1930	3	Staysail Schooner	50.3	7.9
Christian Radich	Norway	1937	3	Full-rigged ship	62.5	9.7
Cisne Branco	Brazil	1999	3	Full-rigged ship	60.5	10.7
Constitution	United States	1797	3	Full-rigged ship	62	13.26
Creole	United Kingdom	1927	3	Schooner	42.7	8.9
Creoula	Portugal	1937	4	Schooner	62.2	9.9
Cuauhtemoc	Mexico	1982	3	Barque	67.2	12.0
Danmark	Denmark	1932	3	Full-rigged ship	59.8	10.1
Dar Młodzieży	Poland	1982	3	Full-rigged ship	94.8	14.0
Dewaruci	Indonesia	1953	3	Barquentine	49.7	9.4
Druzhba	Ukraine	1987	3	Full-rigged ship	94.2	14
Eagle	United States	1936	3	Barque	80.7	12.0
Eendracht	Netherlands	1989	3	Gaff Schooner	55.3	12.2
Elissa	United States	1877	3	Barque	45.4	8.5
Esmeralda	Chile	1953	4	Barquentine	94.13	13.1
Eugene Eugenides	Greece	1959	3	Topgallant Schooner		9.2
Europa	Netherlands	1911	3	Barque	44.5	7.3
Gazela	United States	1901	3	Barquentine	42.7	7.9
Georg Stage (II)	Denmark	1935	3	Full-rigged ship	42	8.5
Gloria	Colombia	1968	3	Barque	67	10.7
Golden Quest	Tuvalu	1945	3	Barque	48	7.5
Gorch Fock (I)	Germany	1933	3	Barque	73.7	12.0
Gorch Fock (II)	Germany	1958	3	Barque	81.2	12.0
Greif	Germany	1950	2	Brigantine	41.1	7.4
Großherzogin Elizabeth	Germany	1908	3	Gaff Schooner	53	8.2
Guayas	Ecuador	1977	3	Barque	56.10	10.4
Iskra (II)	Poland	1982	3	Barquentine	40	7.9
Italia	Italy	1993	2	Brigantine	53.7	9.16
Jadran	Montenegro	1933	3	Topsail Schooner	60	8.9
James Craig	Australia	1874	3	Barque	54.8	9.5
Jessica	Australia	1983	3	Topsail Schooner		6.7
Juan Sebastián Elcano	Spain	1927	4	Topsail Schooner	94.13	13.1
Juan Bautista Cambiaso	Dominican Republic	2009	3	Barquentine	54.60	8.5
Kaiwo Maru II	Japan	1989	4	Barque	89.0	13.8
Kaliakra	Bulgaria	1984	3	Barquentine	43.2	7.9
Khersones	Ukraine	1989	3	Full-rigged ship	94.8	14.0
Kruzenshtern	Russia	1926	4	Barque	95	14.0
Leeuwin II	Australia	1986	3	Barquentine	41.2	9.0
Libertad	Argentina	1960	3	Full-rigged ship	91.7	13.7
La Grace	Czech Republic	2010	2	Brig	32.8	6.06
Lord Nelson	United Kingdom	1985	3	Barque	40.2	8.5
Mercator	Belgium	1932	3	Barquentine	68	10.6
Meridian	Lithuania	1948	3	Barquentine		8.9
Mir	Russia	1987	3	Full-rigged ship	94.8	14.0
Mircea	Romania	1938	3	Barque	73.7	12.0
Morgenster	Netherlands	1919	2	Brig	38.0	6.0
U.S. Brig Niagara	United States	1988	2	Brig	37.5	9.8
Nippon Maru	Japan	1984	4	Barque	89.0	13.8
Oosterschelde	Netherlands	1918	3	Topsail Schooner	40.12	7.5
Palinuro	Italy	1934	3	Barquentine	58.7	10.1
Pallada	Russia	1989	3	Full-rigged ship	94.2	14.0
Peacemaker	United States	1989	3	Barquentine	38	10.4
Picton Castle	Canada	1928	3	Barque	45.2	7.3
Pogoria	Poland	1980	3	Barquentine	40.9	7.9
Rah Naward (ex-Prince William)	Pakistan	2001	2	Brig	40.6	9.9
Roald Amundsen	Germany	1952	2	Brig	40.8	7.2
Royal Albatross	Malaysia	2001	4	Barquentine	47.0	7.6
Royal Clipper	Sweden	2000	5	Full-rigged ship	134.8	16.5
Sagres	Portugal	1937	3	Barque	81.3	12.0
Santa Maria Manuela	Portugal	1937	4	Schooner	62.4	9.9
Sedov	Russia	1921	4	Barque	108.7	14.6
Shabab Oman	Oman	1971	3	Barquentine	43.9	8.5
Simón Bolívar	Venezuela	1979	3	Barque	70.0	10.4
Sørlandet	Norway	1927	3	Full-rigged ship	56.7	9.6
Spirit of New Zealand	New Zealand	1986	3	Barquentine	33.2	9.0
Stad Amsterdam	Netherlands	2000	3	Full-rigged ship	62.4	10.5
Statsraad Lehmkuhl	Norway	1914	3	Barque	84.6	12.6
Star of India	United States	1863	3	Barque	62.5	10.7
Stavros S Niarchos	United Kingdom	2000	2	Brig	40.6	9.9
Sudarshini	India	2011	3	Barque	54.0	8.5
Surprise (ex Rose)	United States	1970	3	Full-rigged ship	54.6	9.8
Tarangini	India	1997	3	Barque	54.0	8.5
Thor Heyerdahl	Germany	1930	3	Topsail Schooner	42.5	6.5
Unicorn	United Kingdom	1948	2	Brig		7.3
Unión	Peru	2014	4	Barque	99.0	13.5
Varuna	India	1981	3	Barque	54.0	8.5
Young America	United States	1975	2	Brigantine		7.2
Young Endeavour	Australia	1986	2	Brigantine	35	7.8

Historical
Name	Last nationality	Original delivery	Mast	Rig	End
Alexander von Humboldt	Germany	1906	3	Barque	Sold 2011/ relocated to Caribbean, 2013 returned to Germany; currently docked
Bounty	United States	1960	3	Full-rigged ship	Sank 2012
Concordia	Canada	1992	3	Barquentine	Sank 2010
Dunay	USSR	1928	3	Full-rigged ship	Burned 1963
Sagres	Portugal	1896	3	Barque	Replaced by the third Sagres in 1961. Sold (1983); now permanently moored in Hamburg, Germany with the name Rickmer Rickmers
Sarmiento	Argentina	1897	3	Full-rigged ship	Museum ship, moored in Buenos Aires, Argentina
Uruguay	Argentina	1874	3	Barque	Museum ship, moored in Buenos Aires, Argentina

=== Class B ===
Traditionally rigged vessels (i.e. gaff rigged sloops, ketches, yawls and schooners) with an LOA of less than 40 metres and with a waterline length (LWL) of at least 9.14 metres, one good example is Spirit of Bermuda.

=== Class C ===
Modern rigged vessels (i.e. Bermudan rigged sloops, ketches, yawls and schooners) with an LOA of less than 40 metres and with a waterline length (LWL) of at least 9.14 metres not carrying spinnaker-like sails.

Class C Tall Ships
Current name	Current nationality	Original delivery	Mast	Rig	Length excluding bowsprit [m]	Beam [m]
Caroly	Italy	1948	2	yawl	23.66	4.8
Capricia	Italy	1963	2	yawl	22.56	5.03
Stella Polare	Italy	1965	2	yawl	21.47	4.89
Corsaro II	Italy	1961	2	yawl	20.9	4.7

=== Class D ===
Modern rigged vessels (i.e. Bermudan-rigged sloops, ketches, yawls and schooners) with an LOA of less than 40 metres and with a waterline length (LWL) of at least 9.14 metres carrying spinnaker-like sails. There are also a variety of other rules and regulations for the crew, such as ages, and also for a rating rule. There are other sail festivals and races with their own standards, the STI is just one set of standards for their purposes.

== Earlier description of classes ==
An older definition of class "A" by the STI was "all square-rigged vessels over 120′ (36.6 m) length overall (LOA). Fore and aft rigged vessels of 160′ (48.8 m) (LOA) and over". By LOA they meant length excluding bowsprit and aft spar.

Class "B" was "all fore and aft rigged vessels between 100 and 160 feet in length, and all square rigged vessels under 120′ (36.6 m) (LOA)".

See also a list of class "A" ships with lengths including bowsprit.

== Lost tall ships ==
Tall ships are sometimes lost, such as by a storm at sea. Some examples of lost tall ships include:

- Asgard II, an Irish national sail training ship, commissioned in 1982, was lost in 2008 off the French coast. The two-masted brigantine is thought to have collided with a submerged object.
- Astrid ran aground in 2013 off Ireland, and then broke up in 2014 after being salvaged
- Bounty, a full-rig ship lost off the North Carolina coast as Hurricane Sandy approached in 2012.
- Concordia, a triple-mast barquentine built in 1992 and operated by Canada as a school ship; lost at sea in 2010, in a squall.
- Endeavour II, built in 1968; wrecked in a 1971 gale off New Zealand
- Fantome, a former yacht built in 1927, then operated as a cruise ship. Was lost in Hurricane Mitch in 1998.
- Lennie, built in 1871, ran aground on Digby Neck in 1889.
- Marques, built in 1917; was lost in a 1984 Tall Ships Race.

== Gallery ==
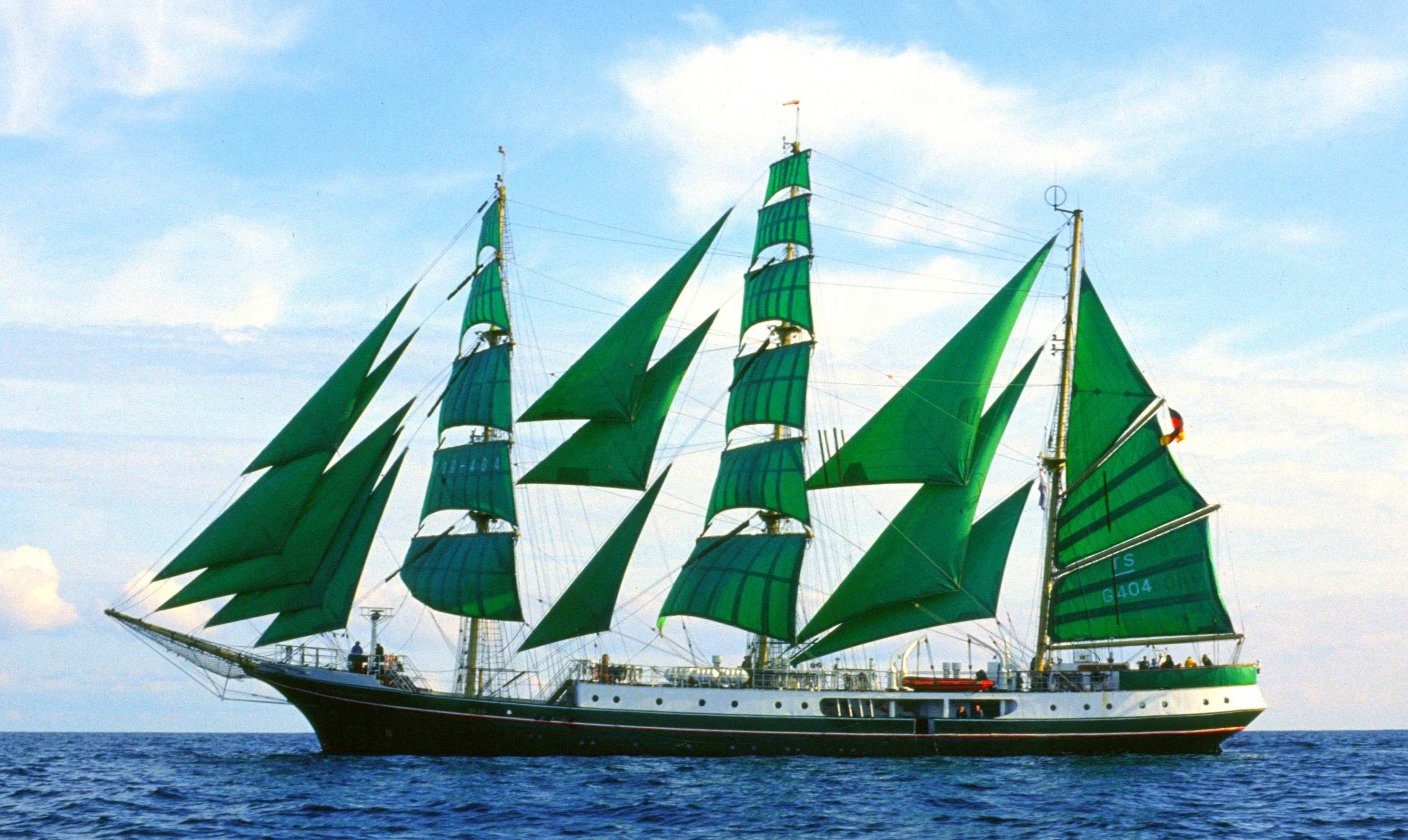
Alexander von Humboldt

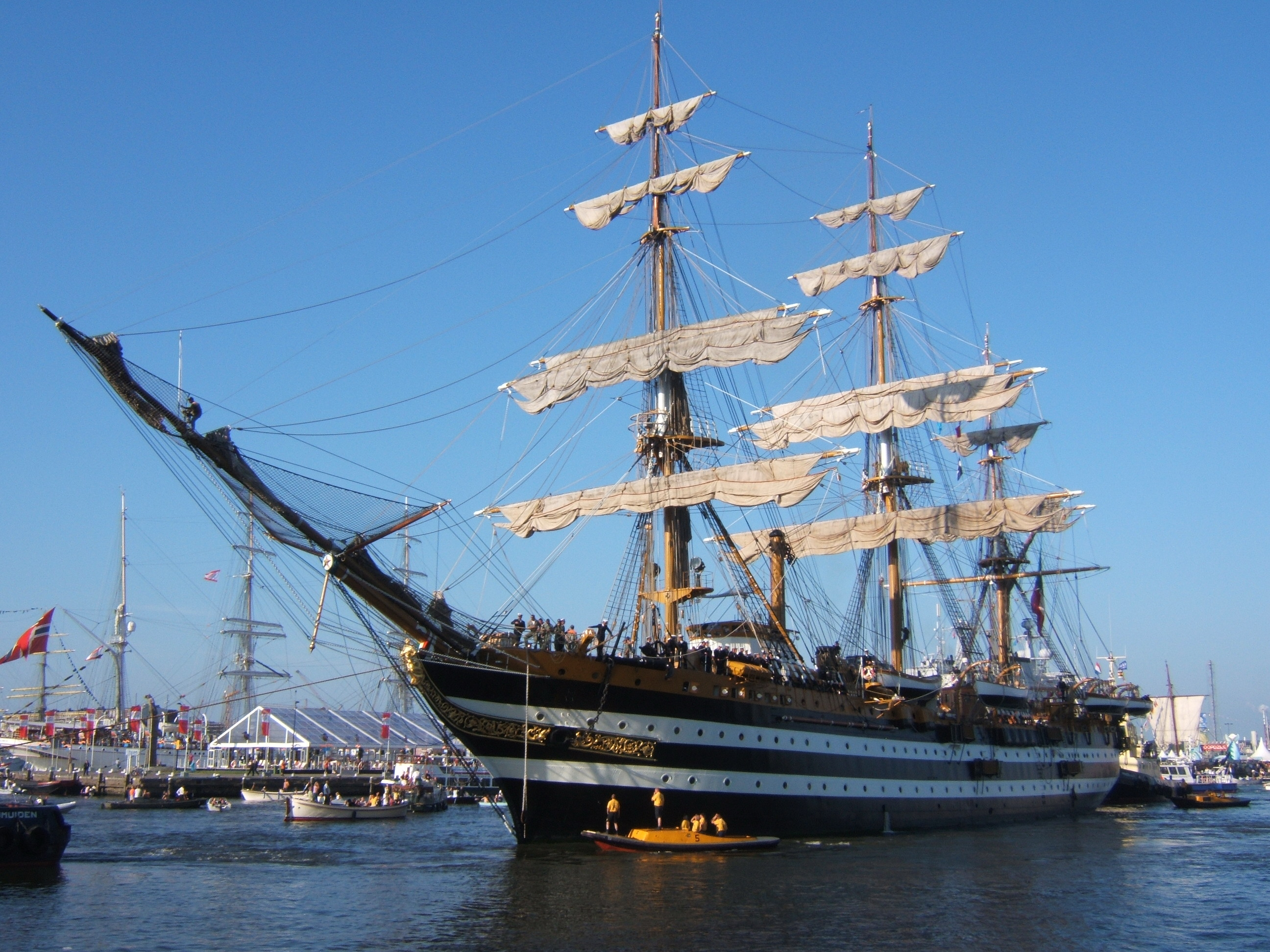
Amerigo Vespucci

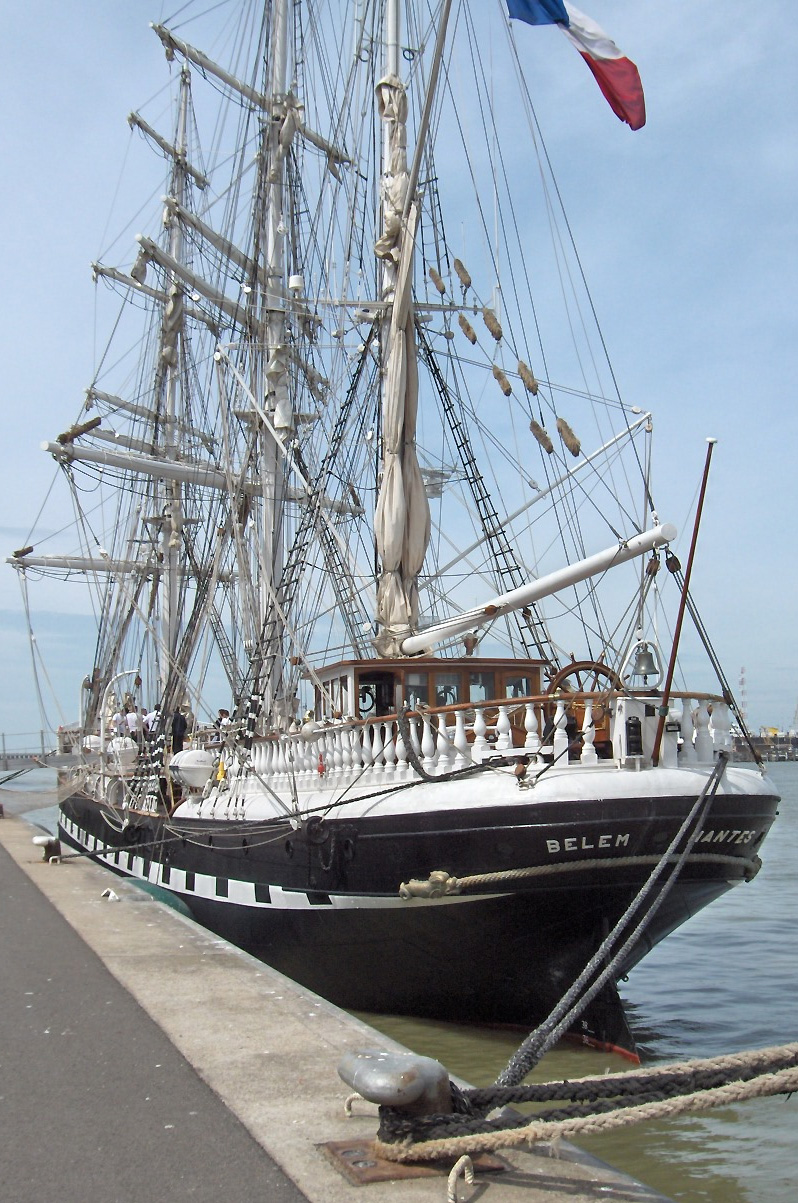
Belem

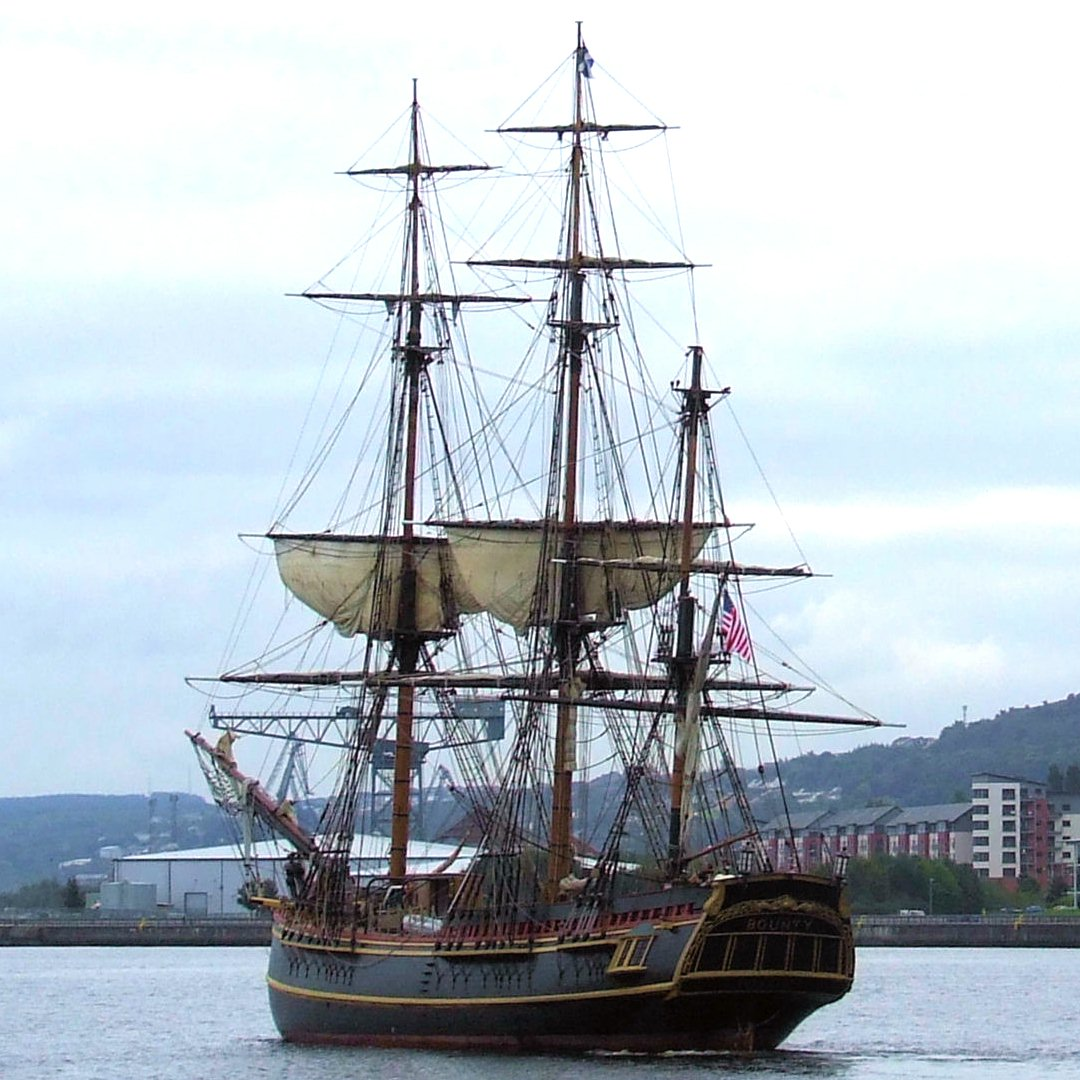
Bounty (1960 ship)

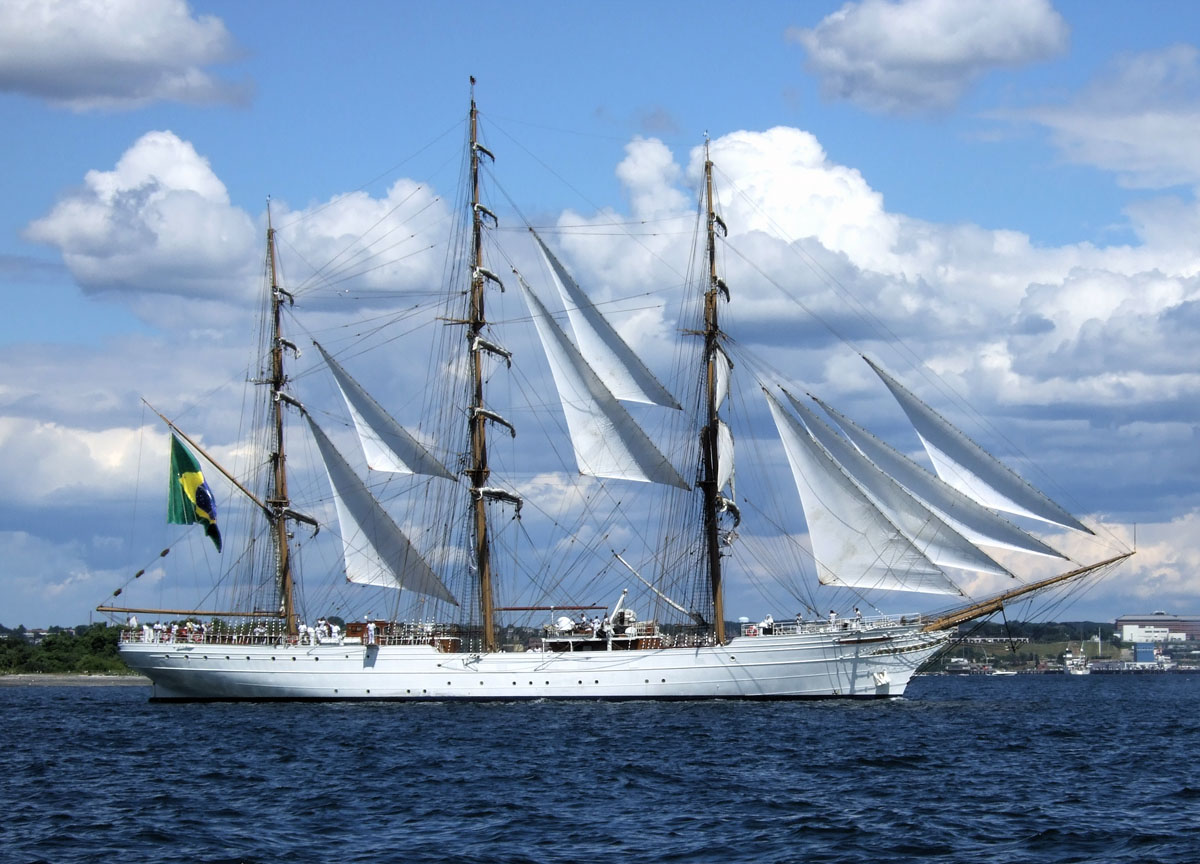
Cisne Branco

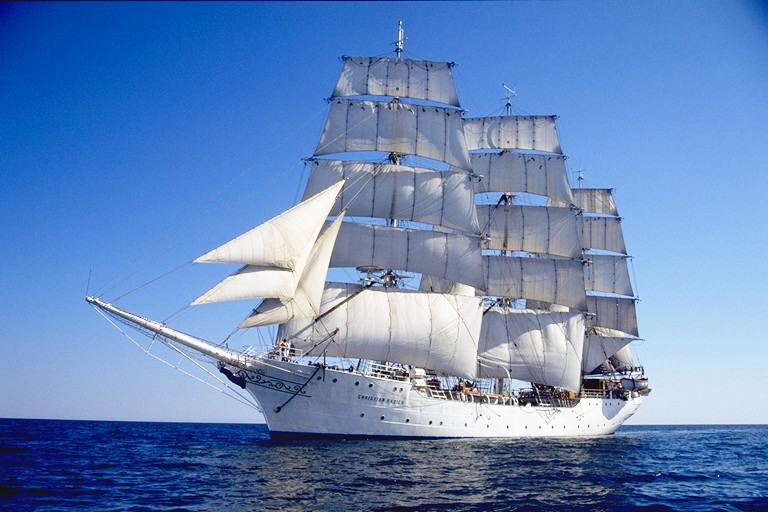
Christian Radich

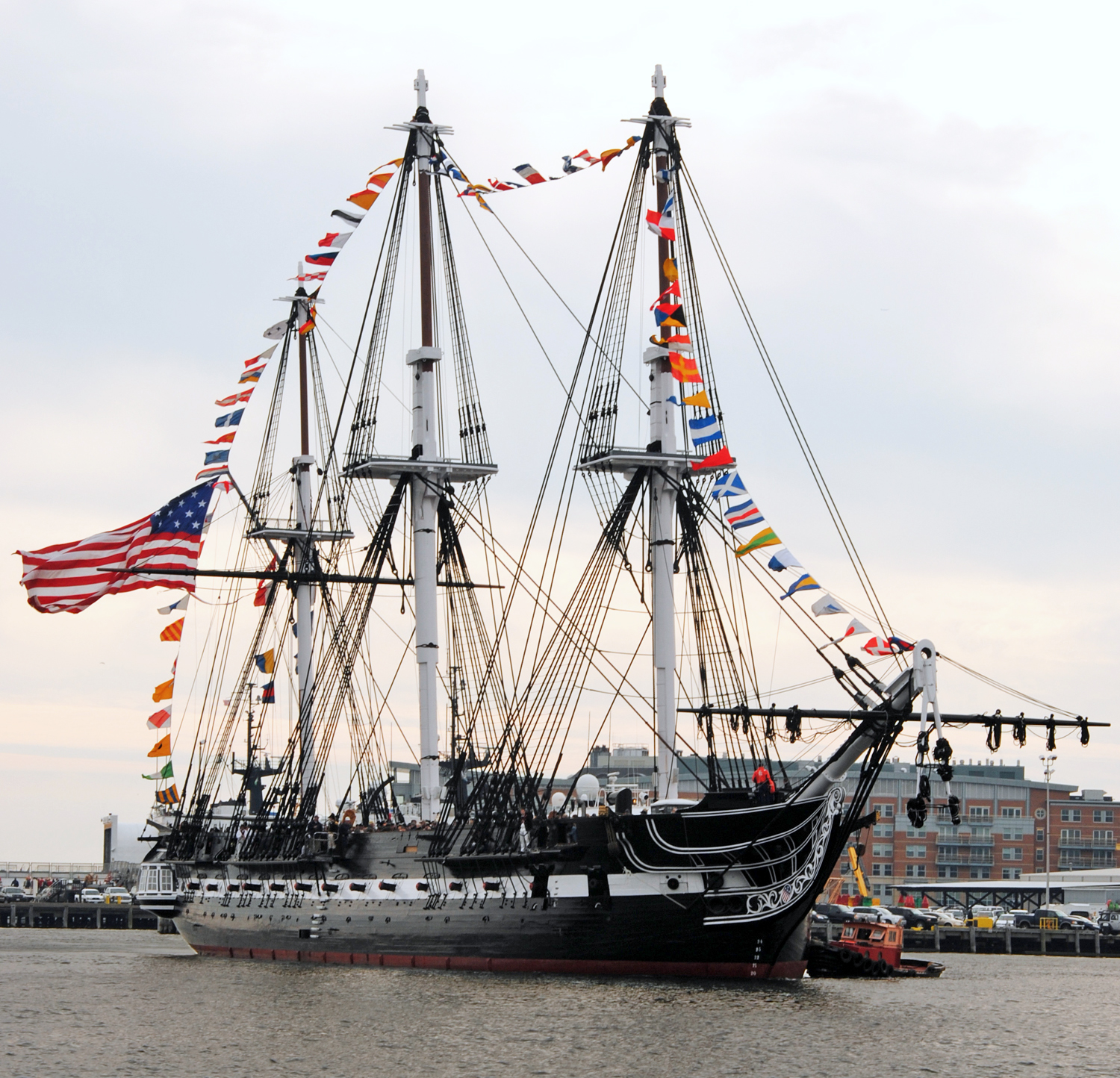
USS Constitution

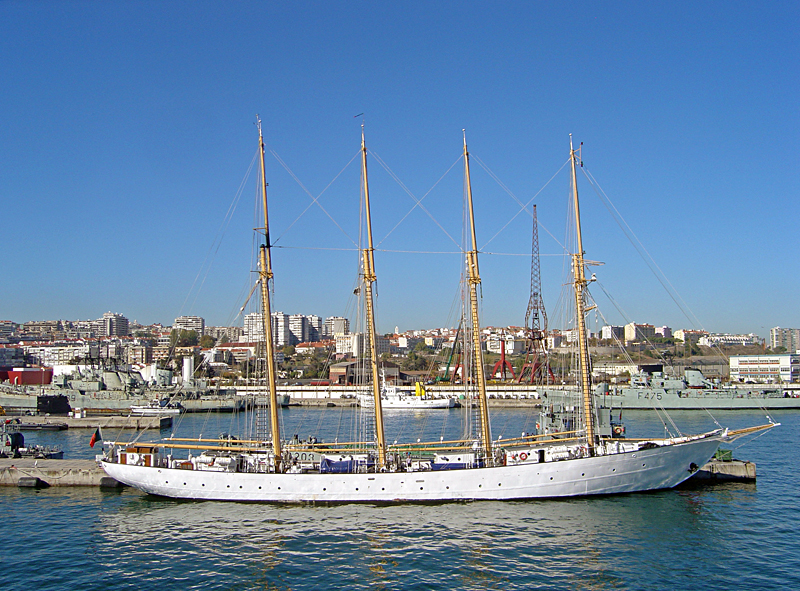
UAM Creoula

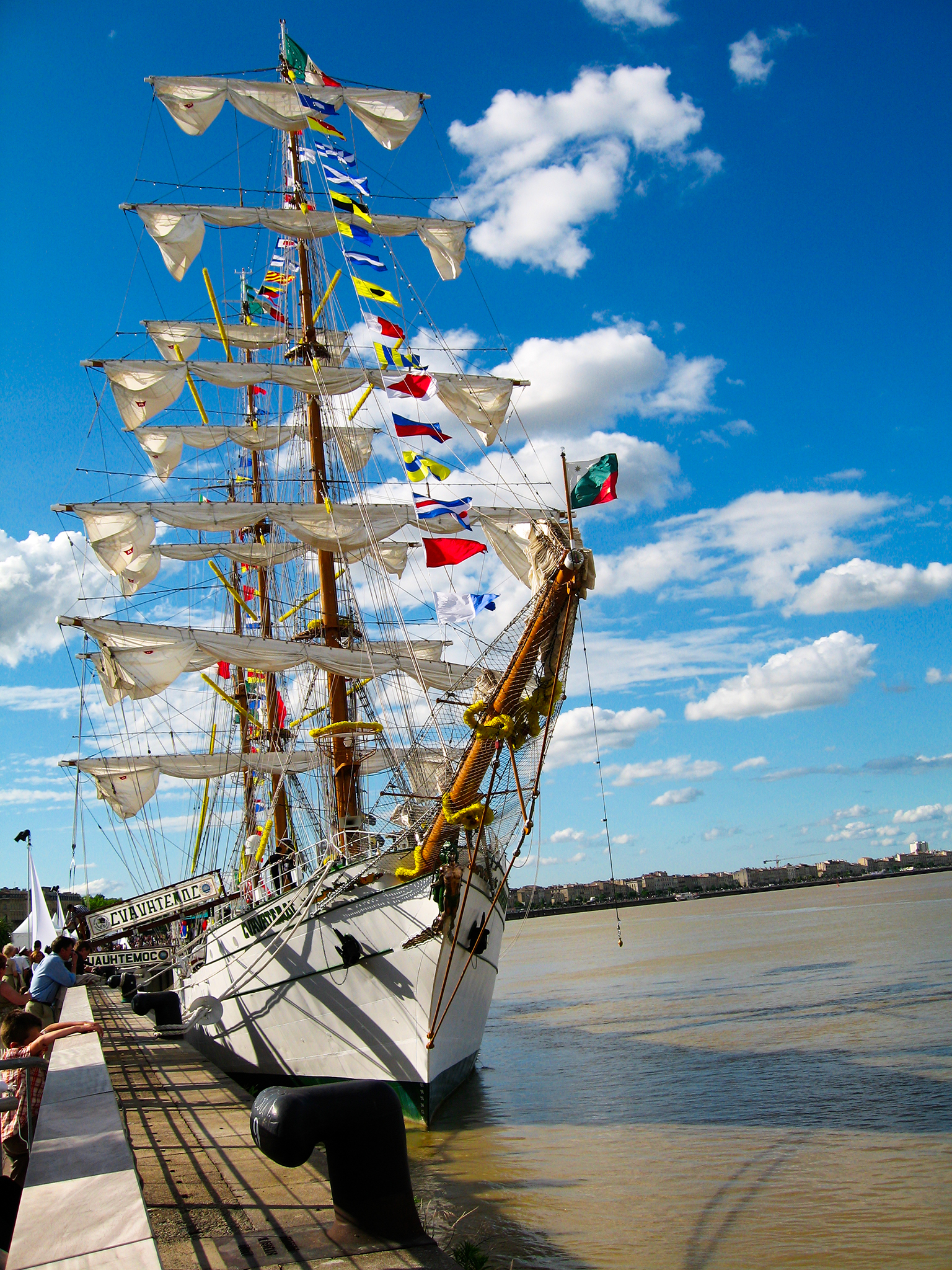
ARM Cuauhtémoc (BE01)

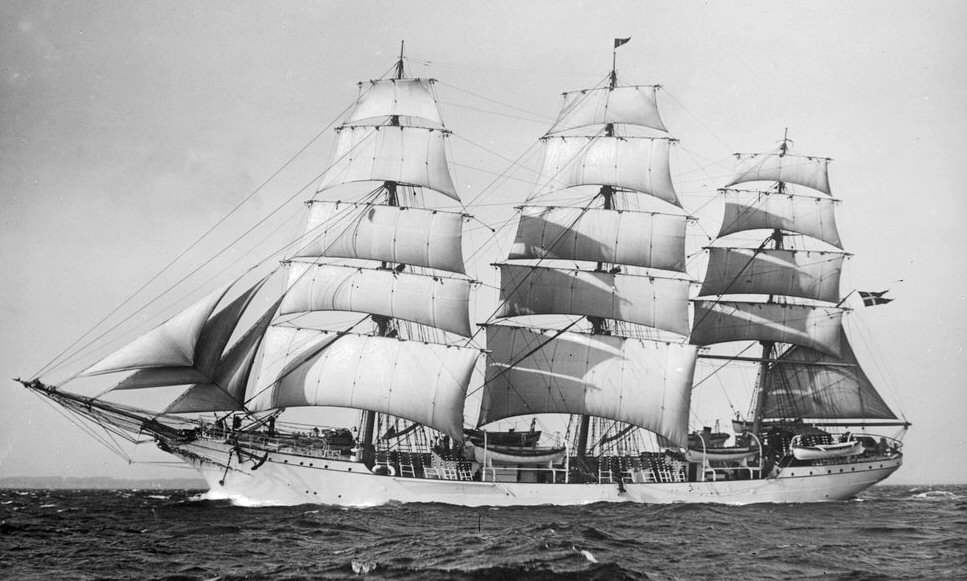
Danmark

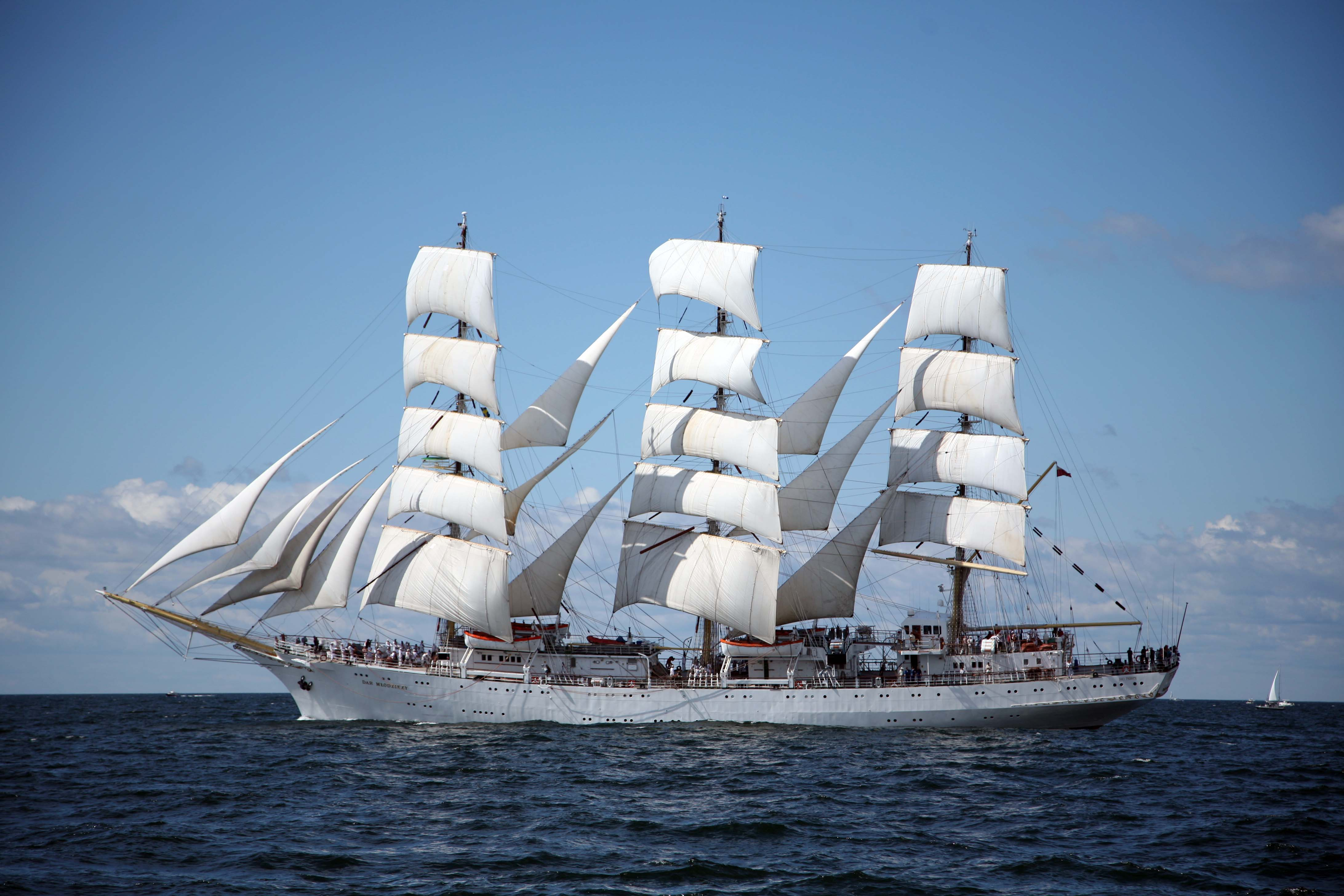
Dar Młodzieży

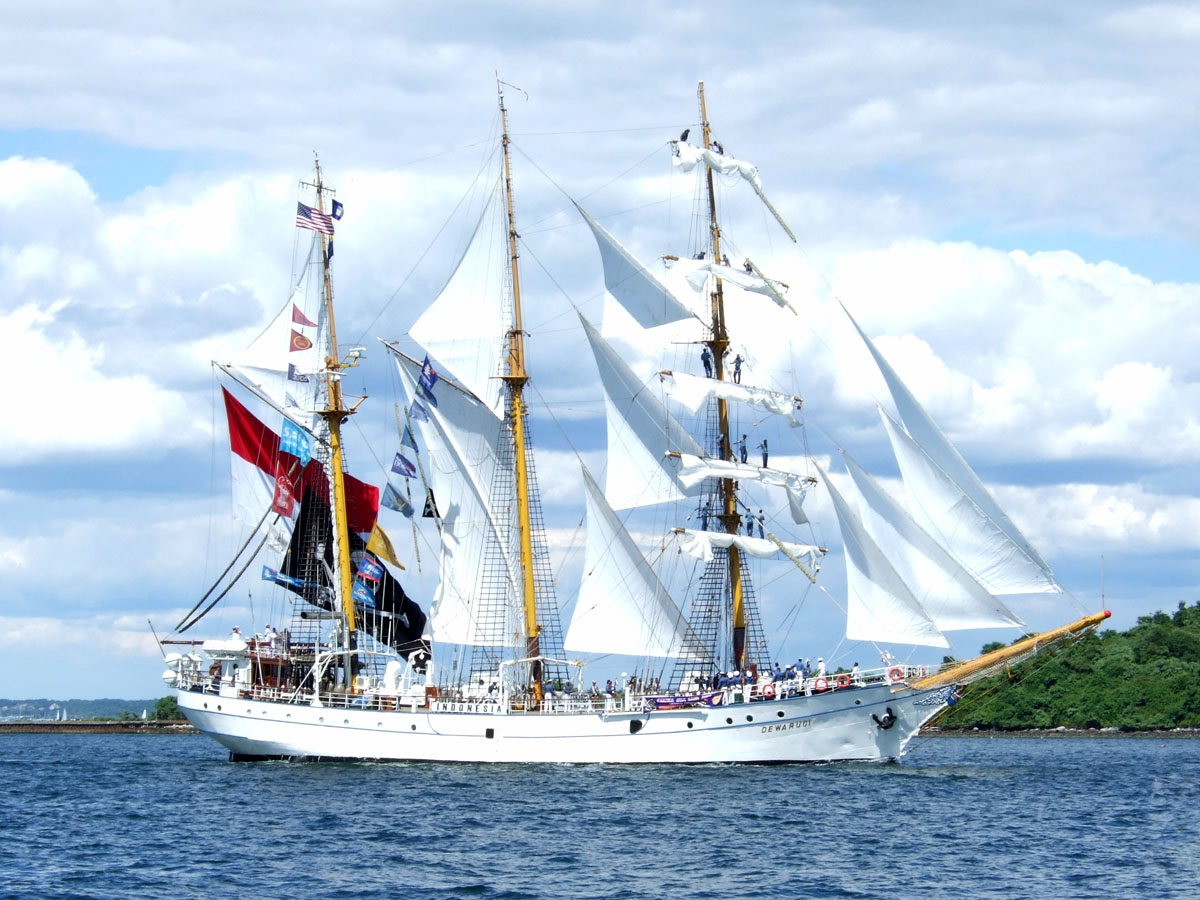
Dewaruci

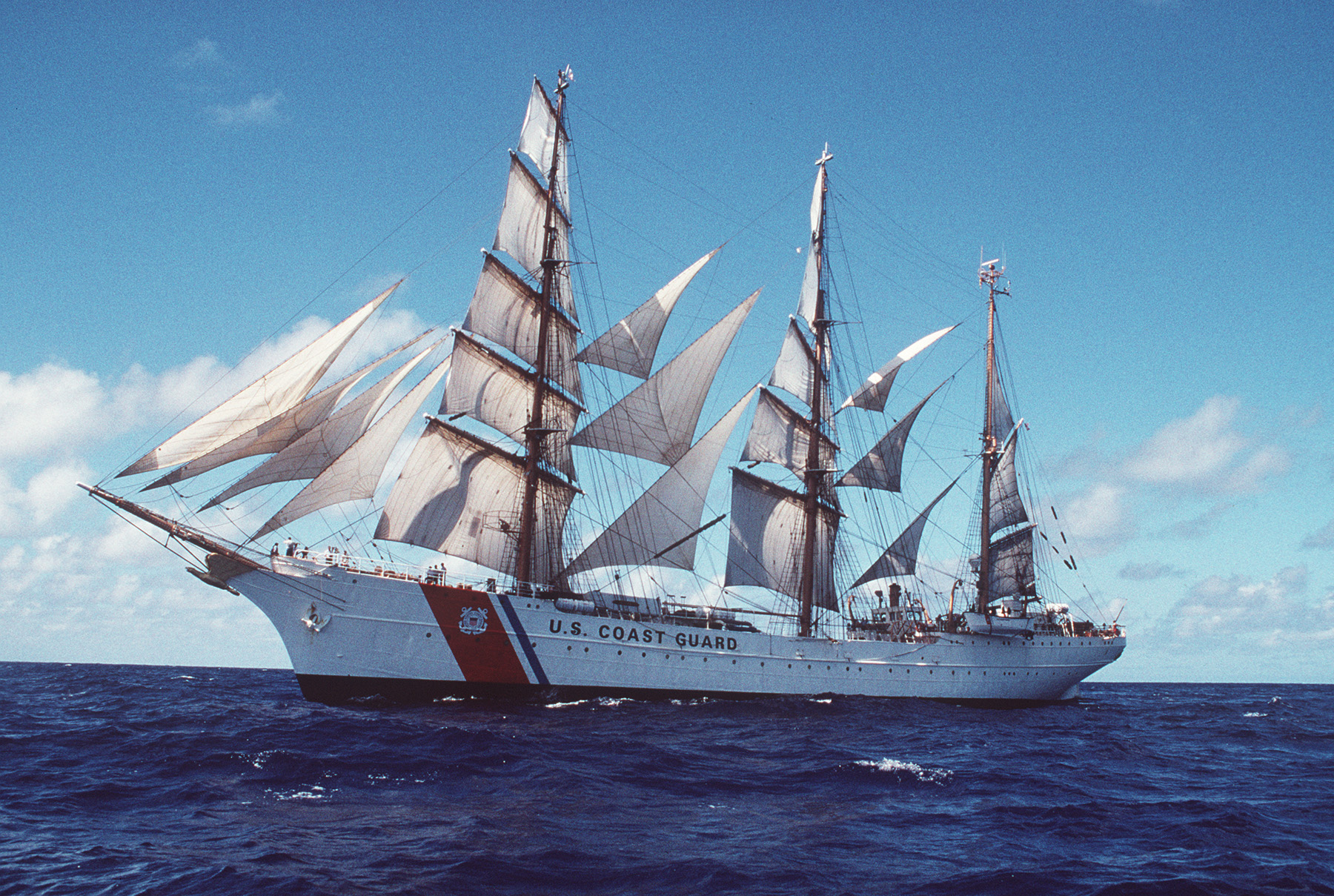
USCGC Eagle

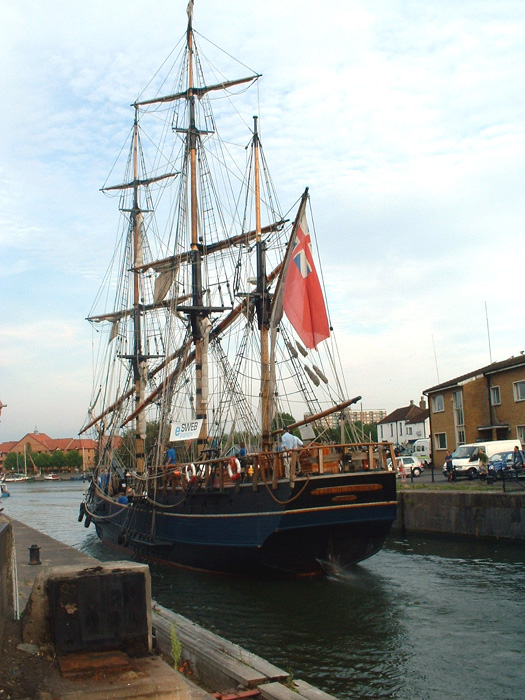
Earl of Pembroke

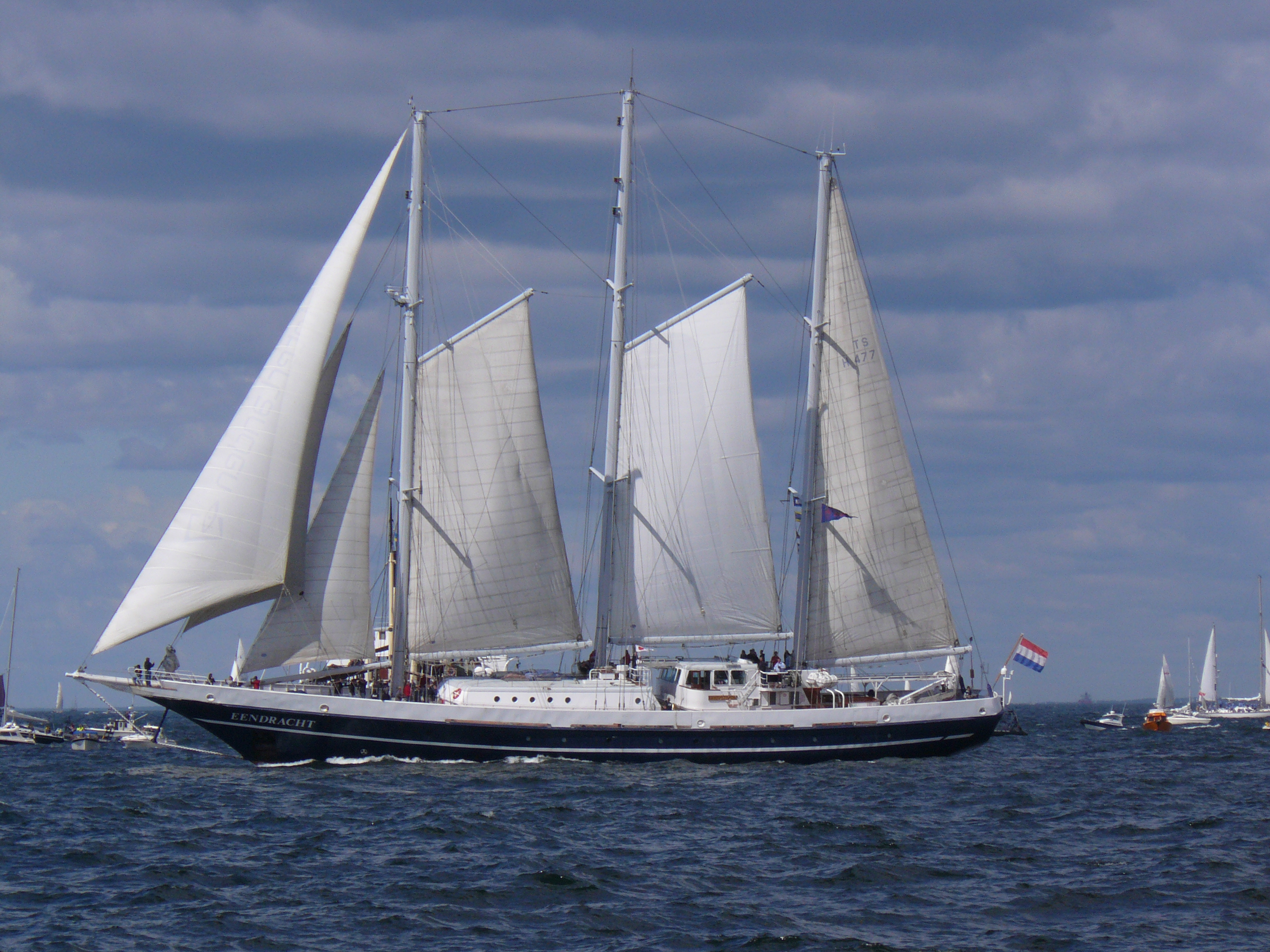
Eendracht

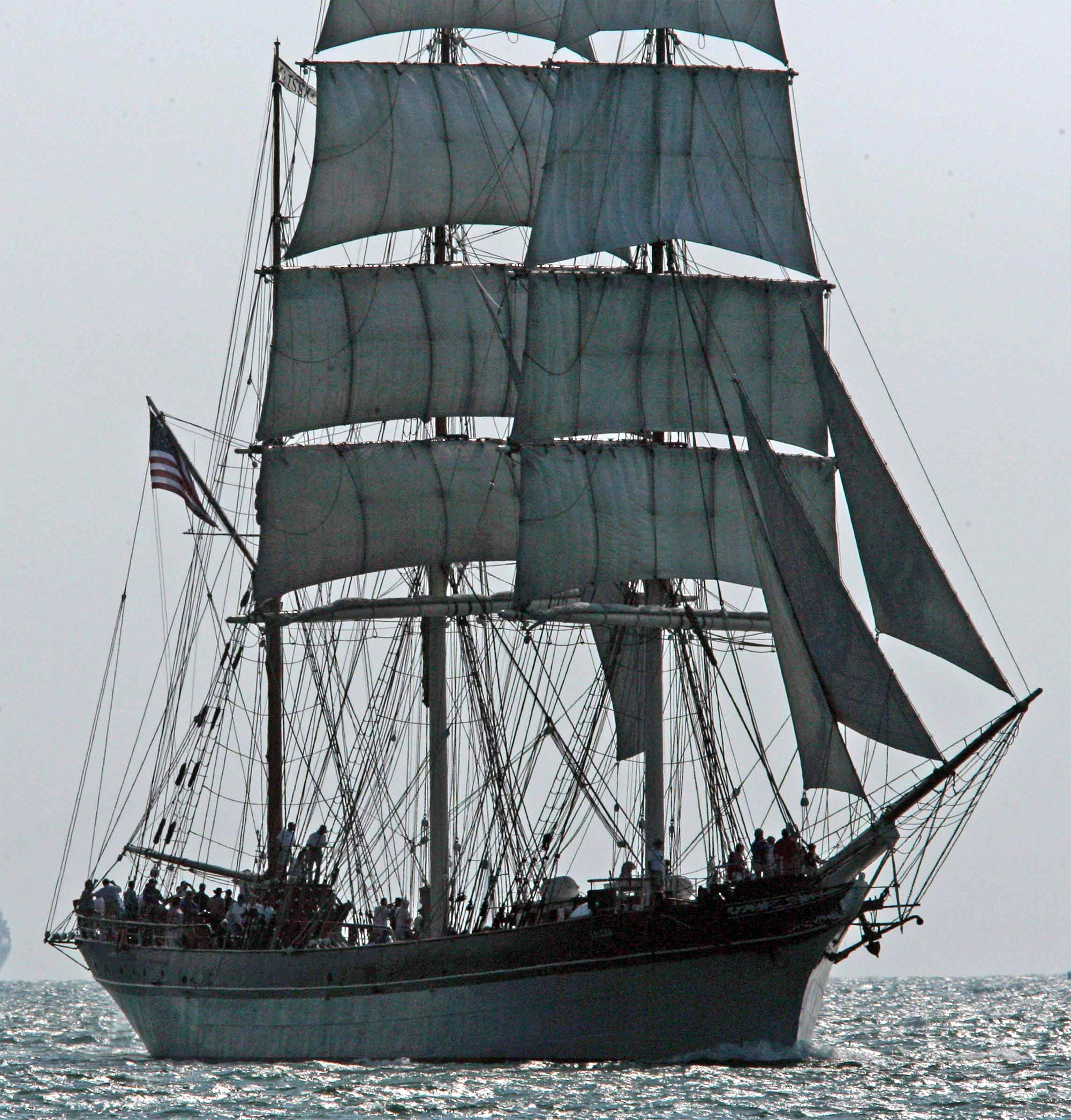
Elissa

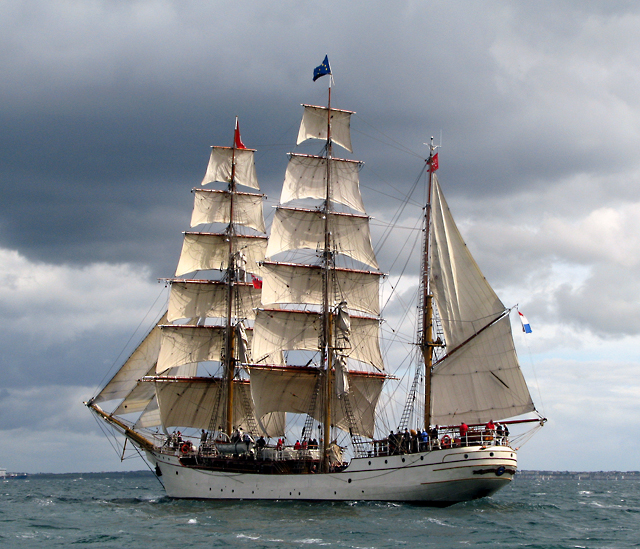
Europa

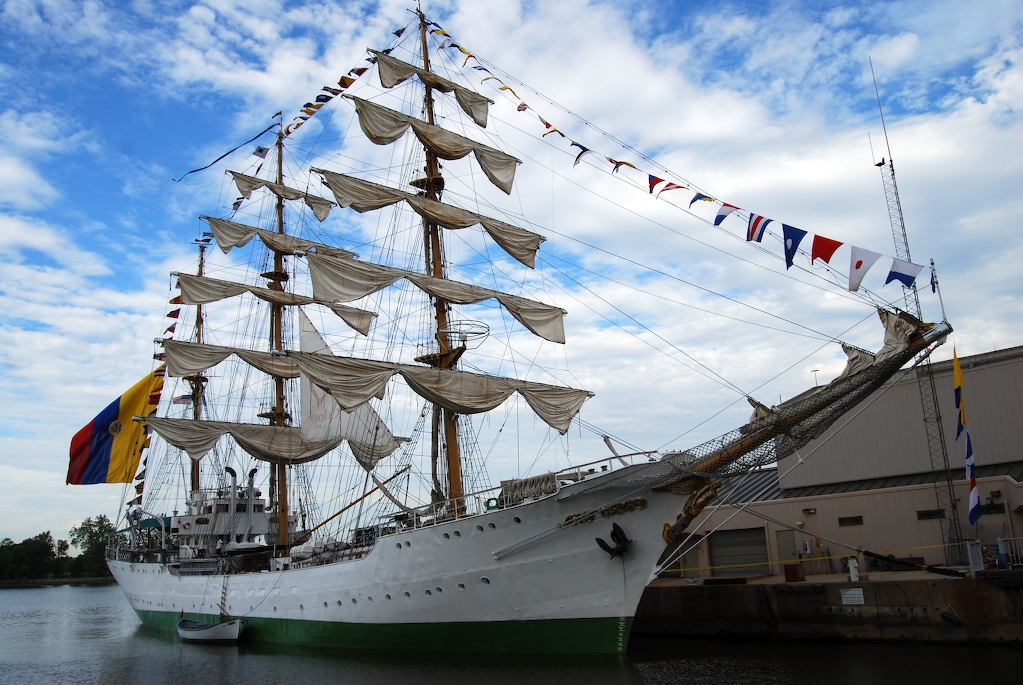
Gloria

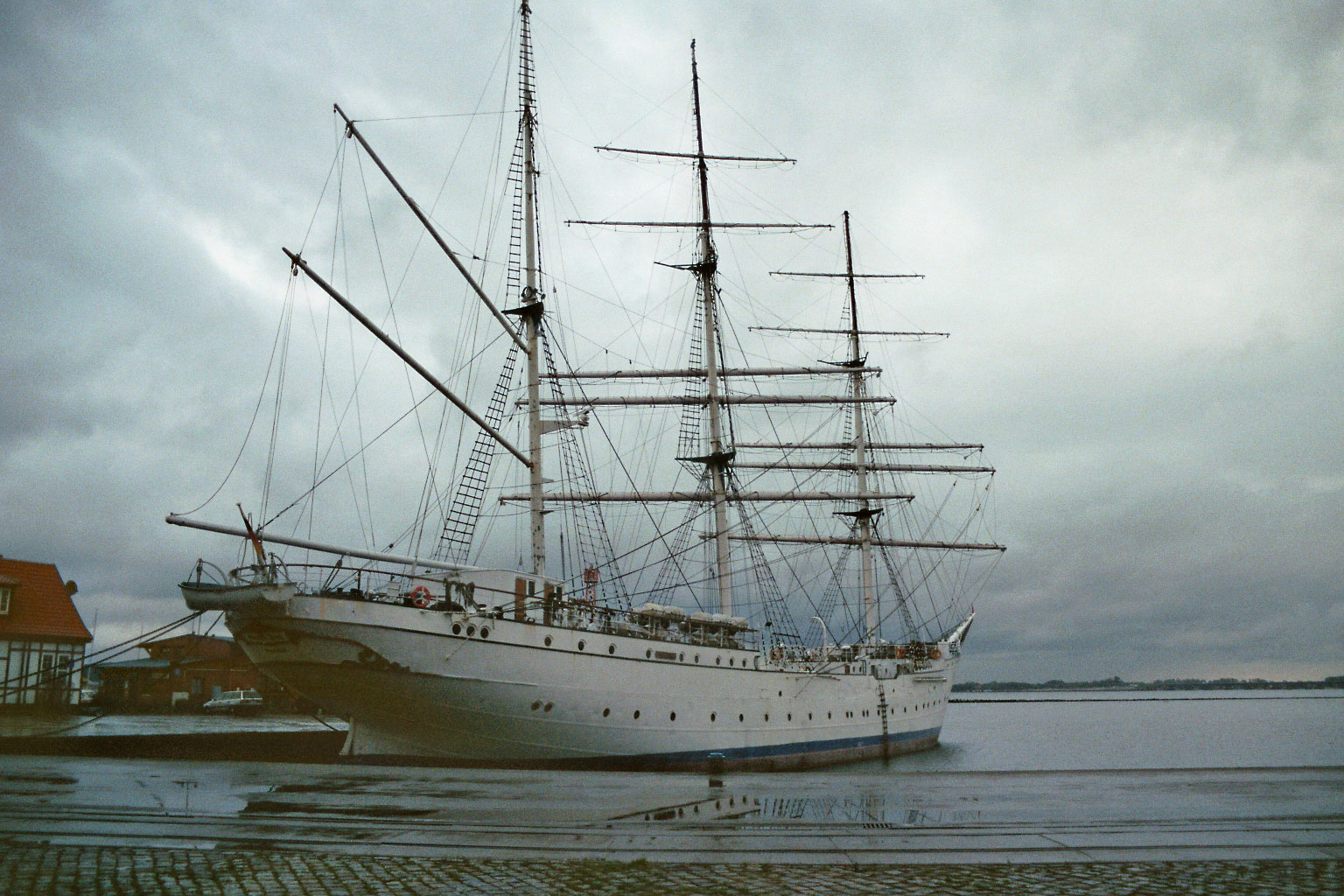
Gorch Fock (I)

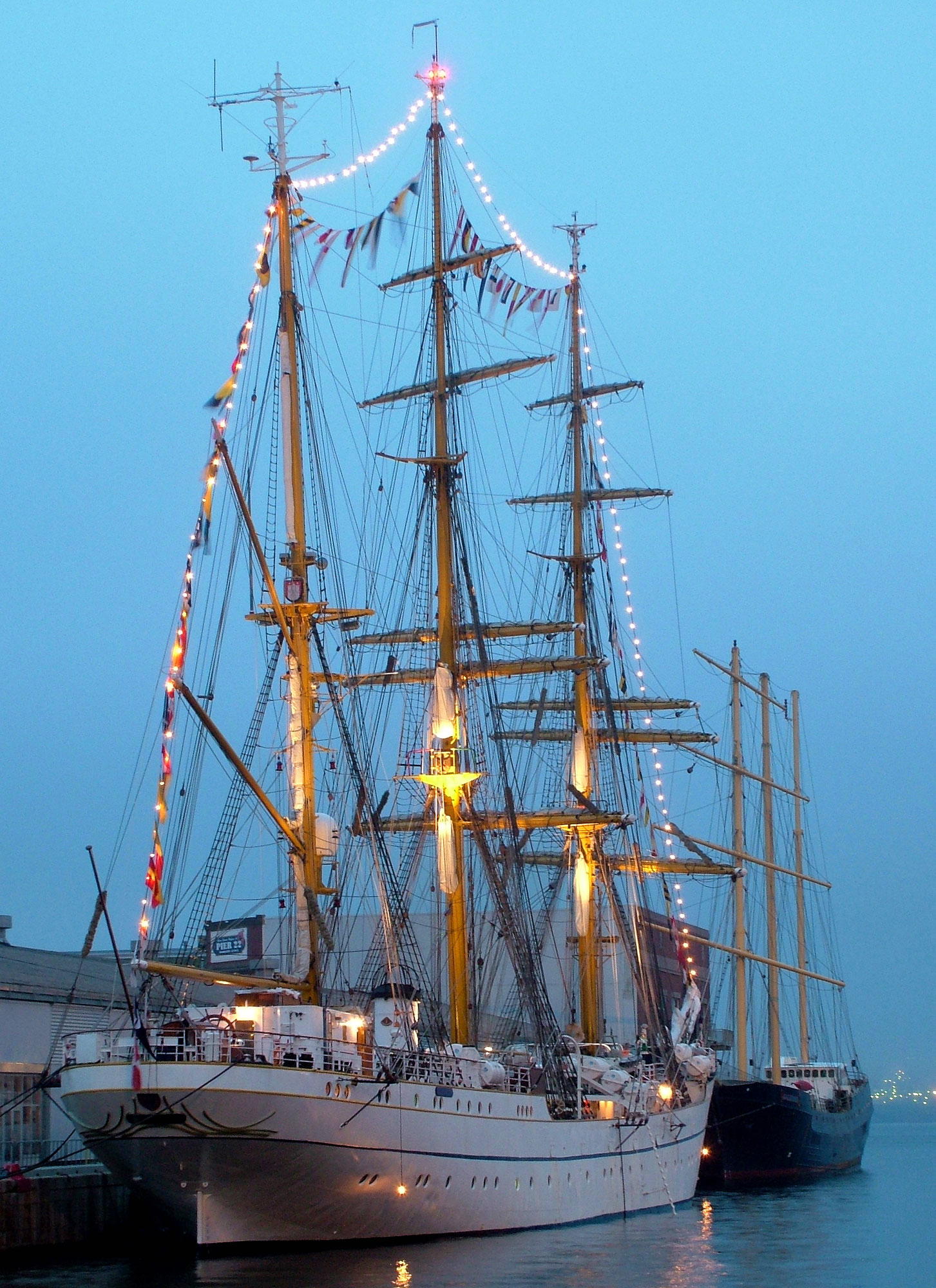
Gorch Fock (II)

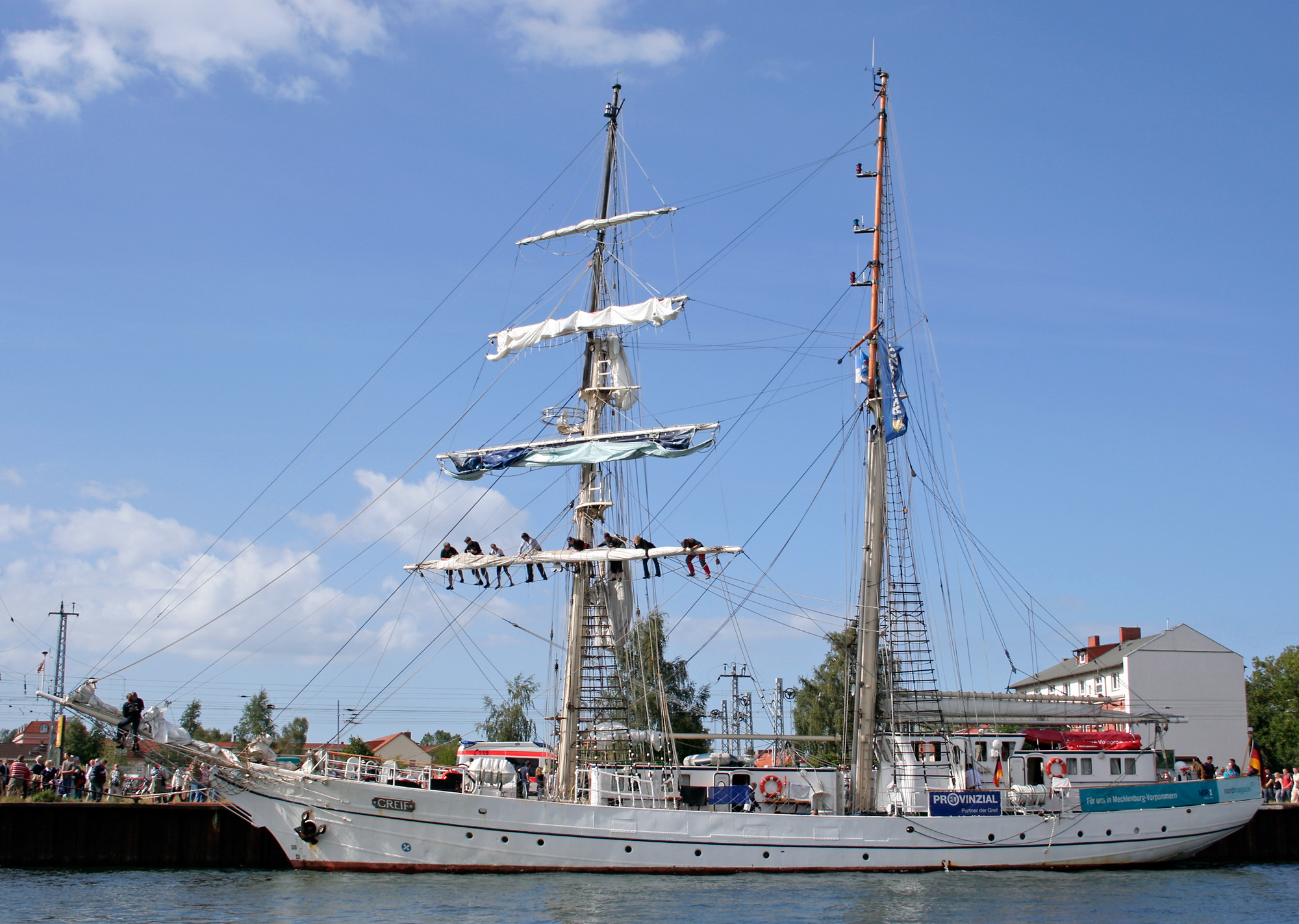
Greif (brigantine)

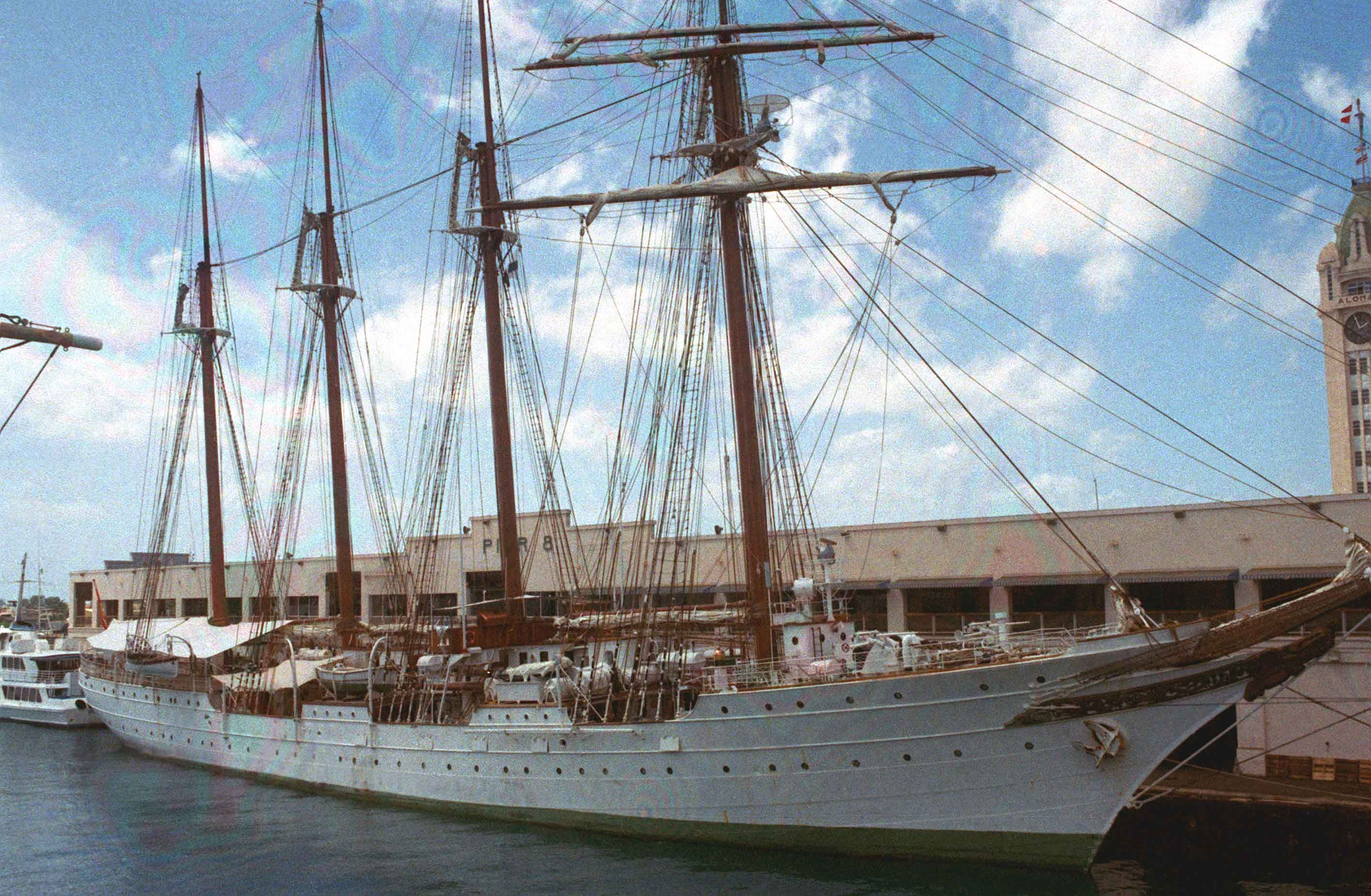
Juan Sebastián Elcano

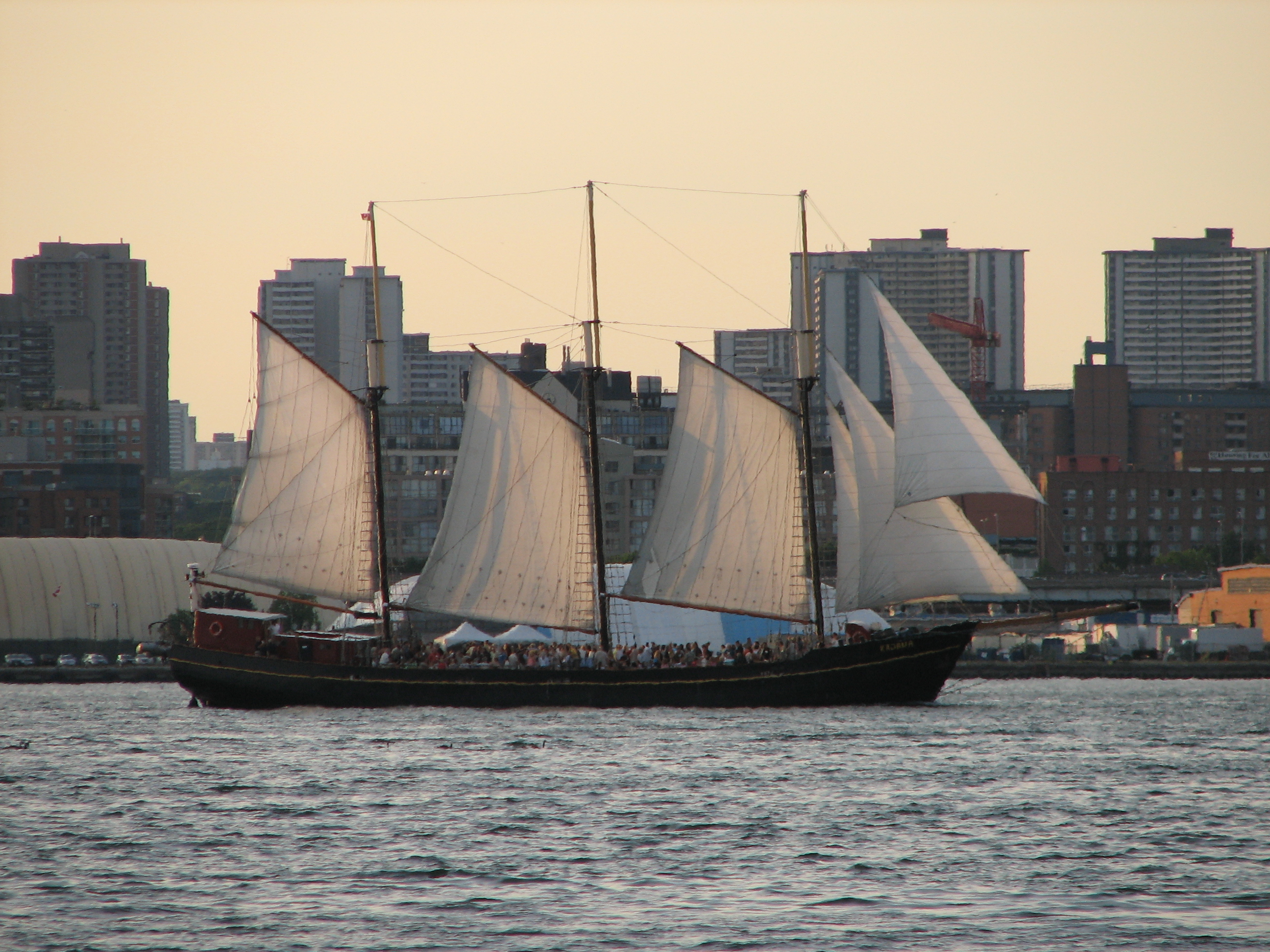
Kajama

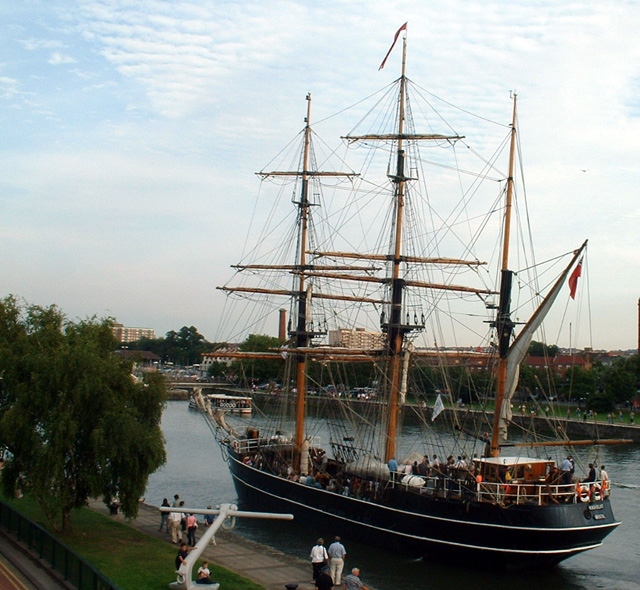
Kaskelot

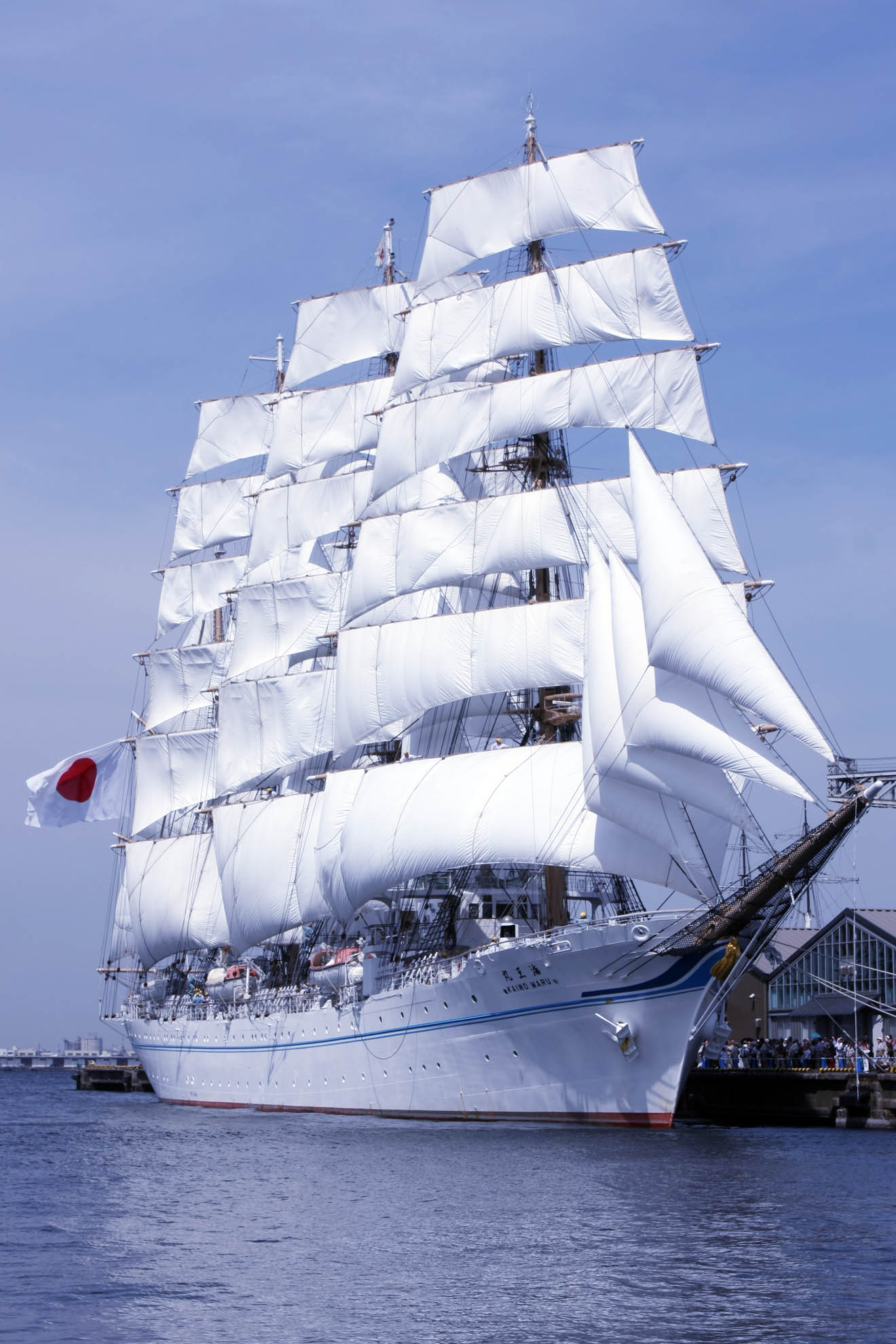
Kaiwo Maru II

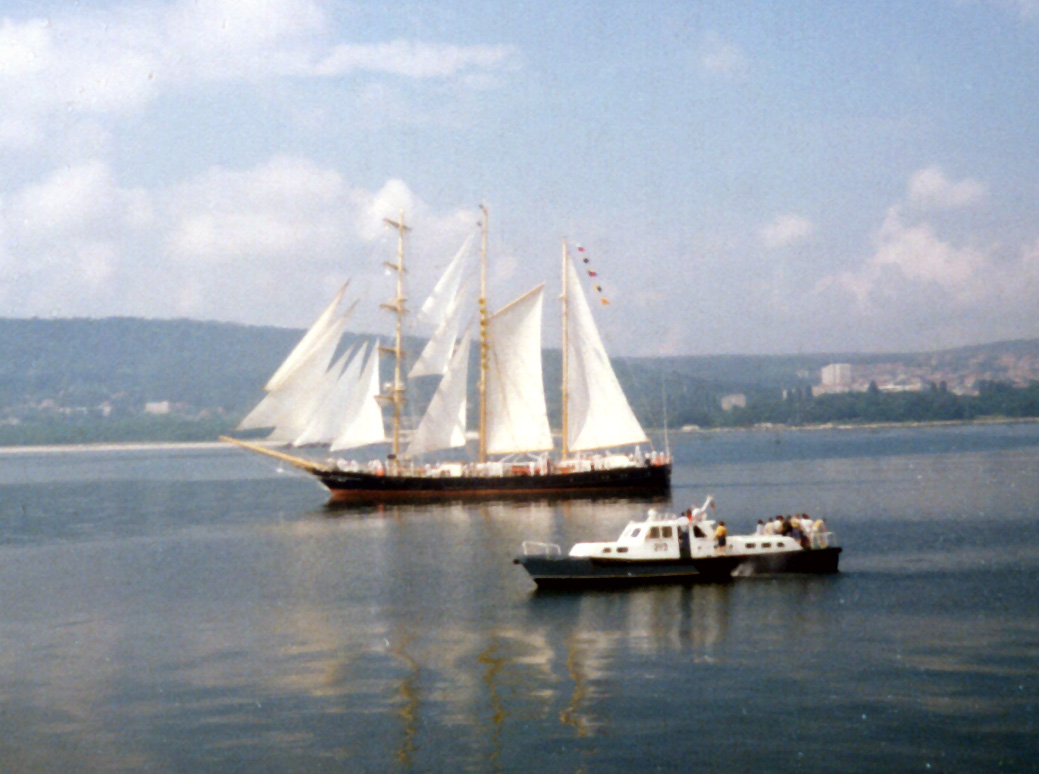
Kaliakra

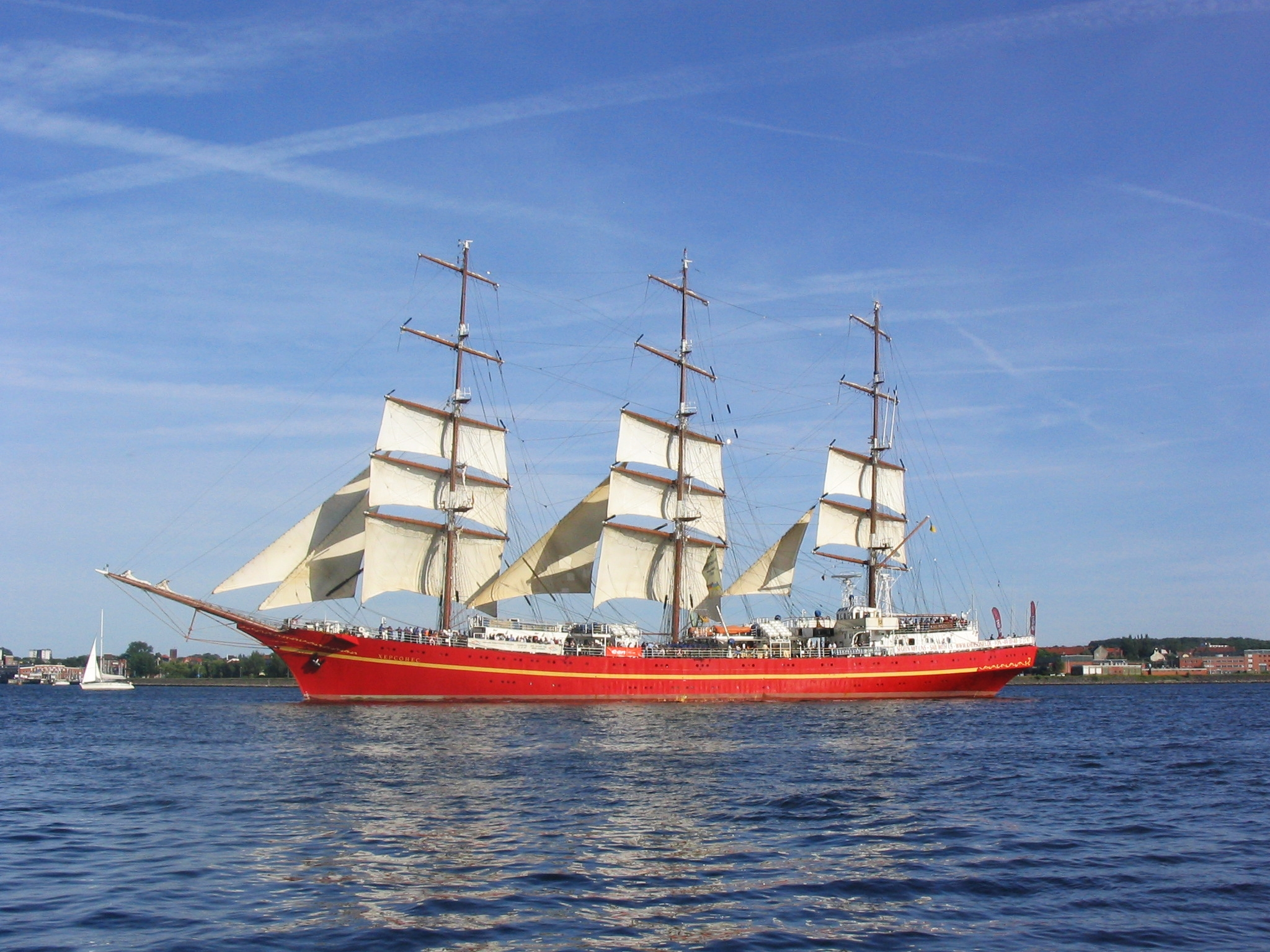
Khersones

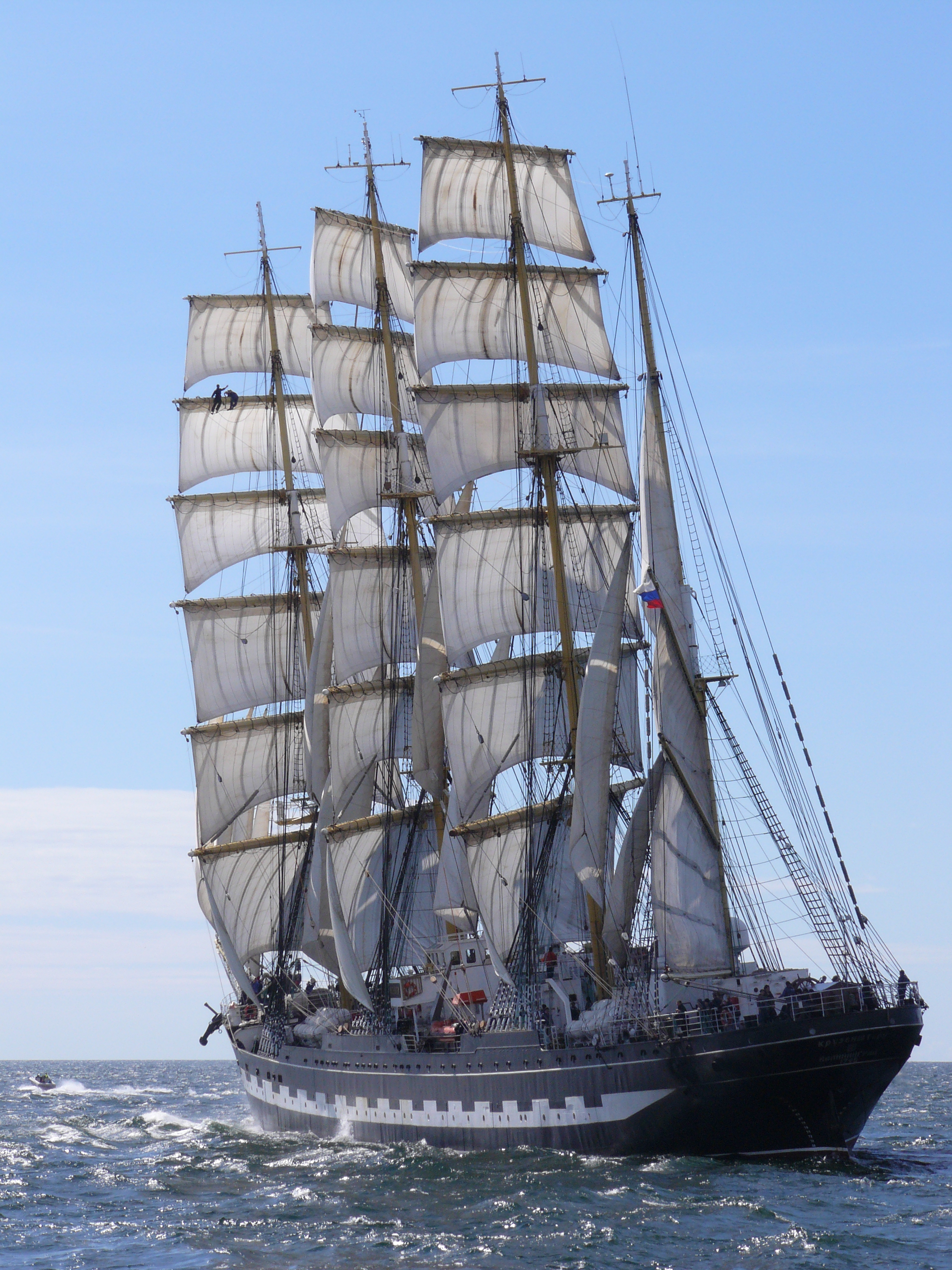
Kruzenshtern

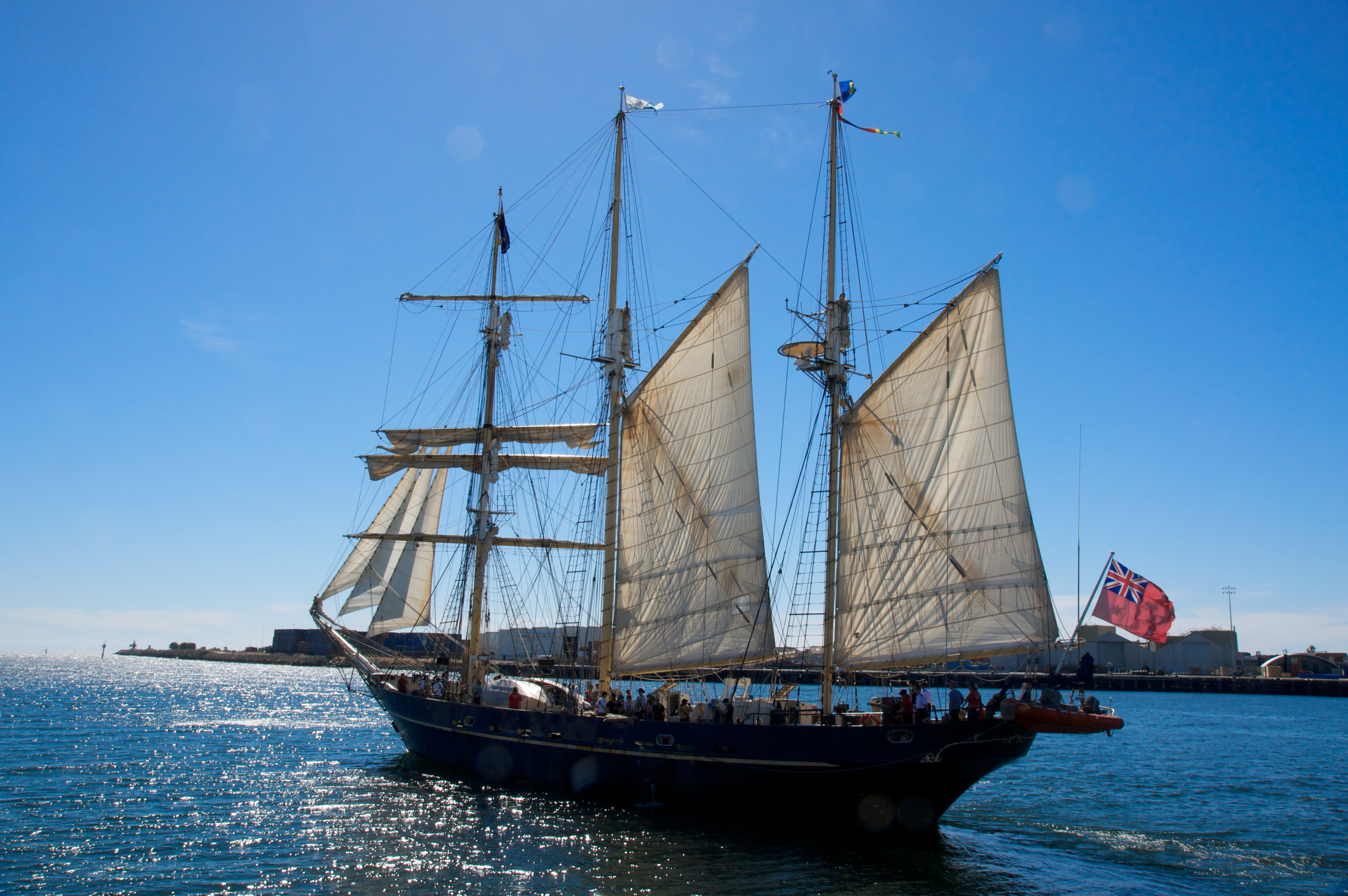
Leeuwin II

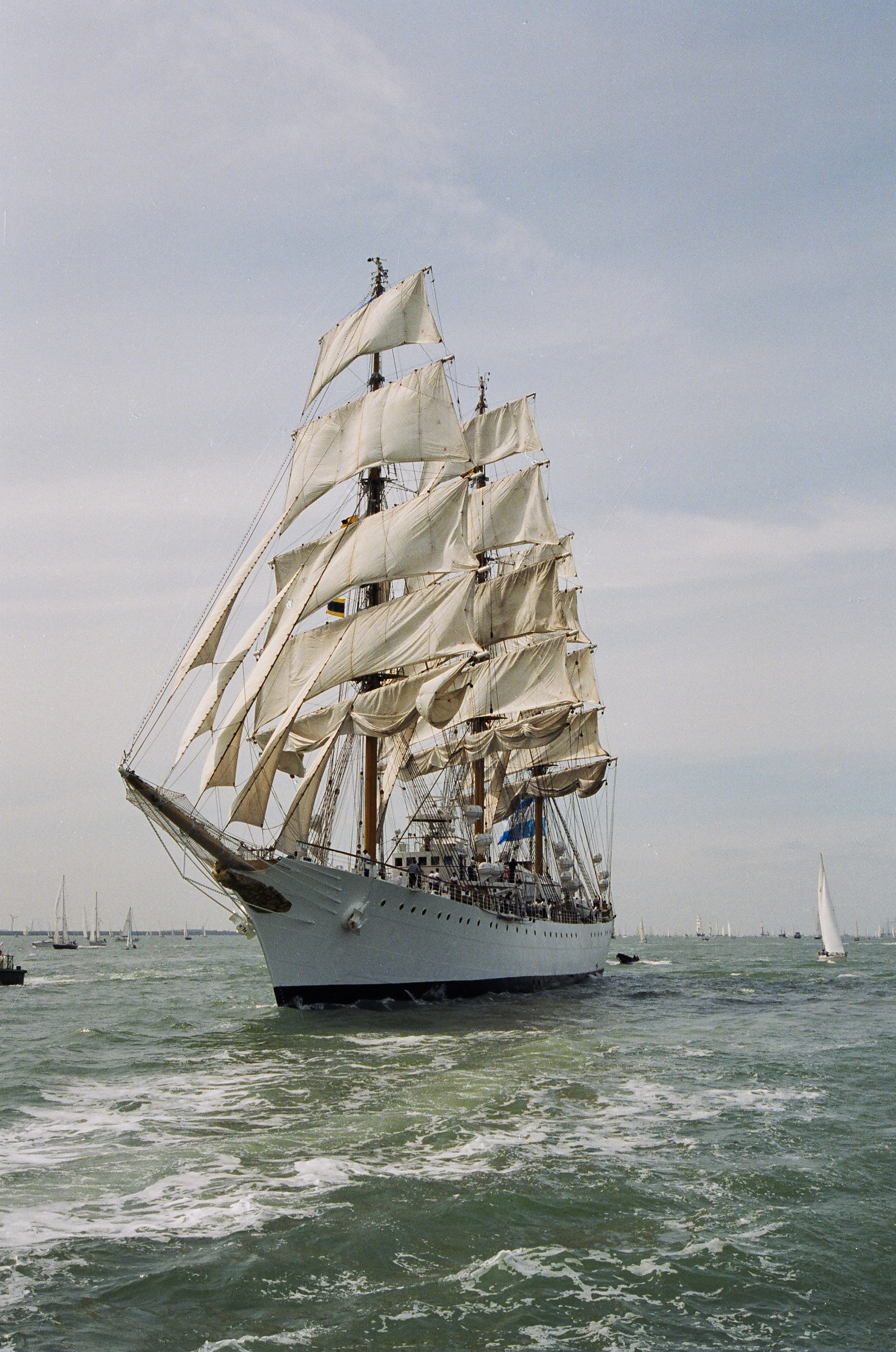
ARA Libertad

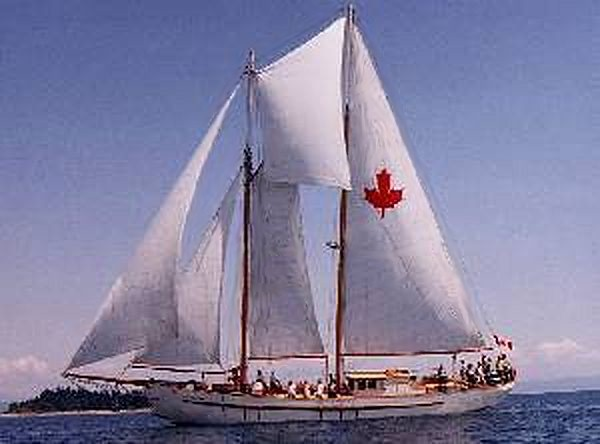
Maple Leaf

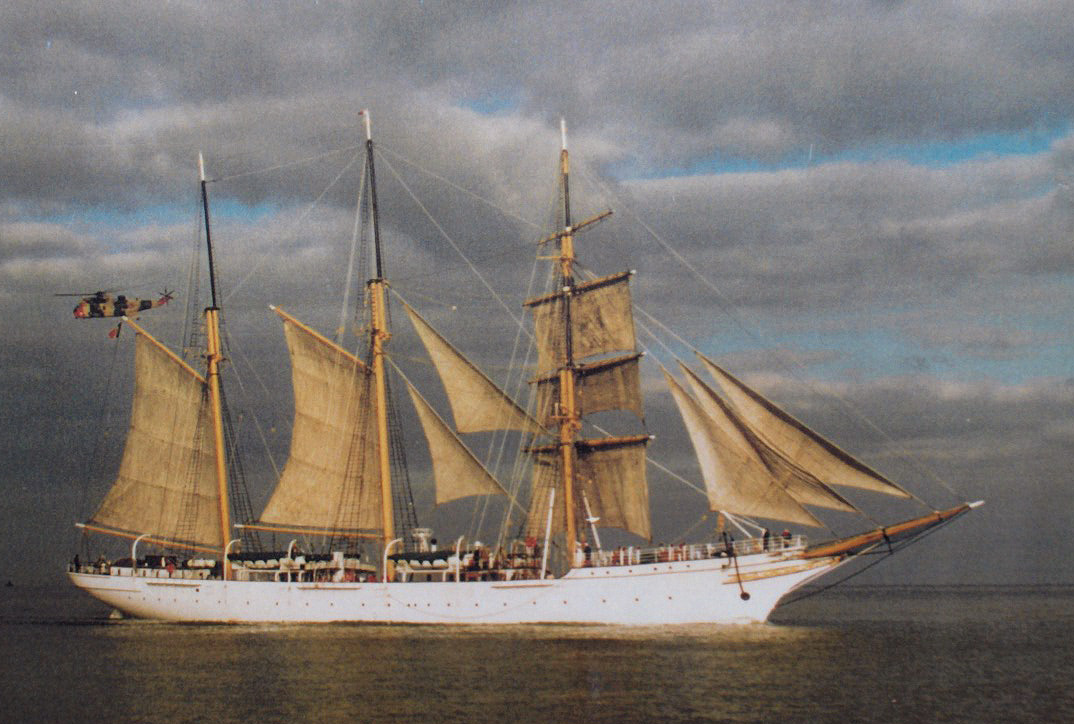
Mercator

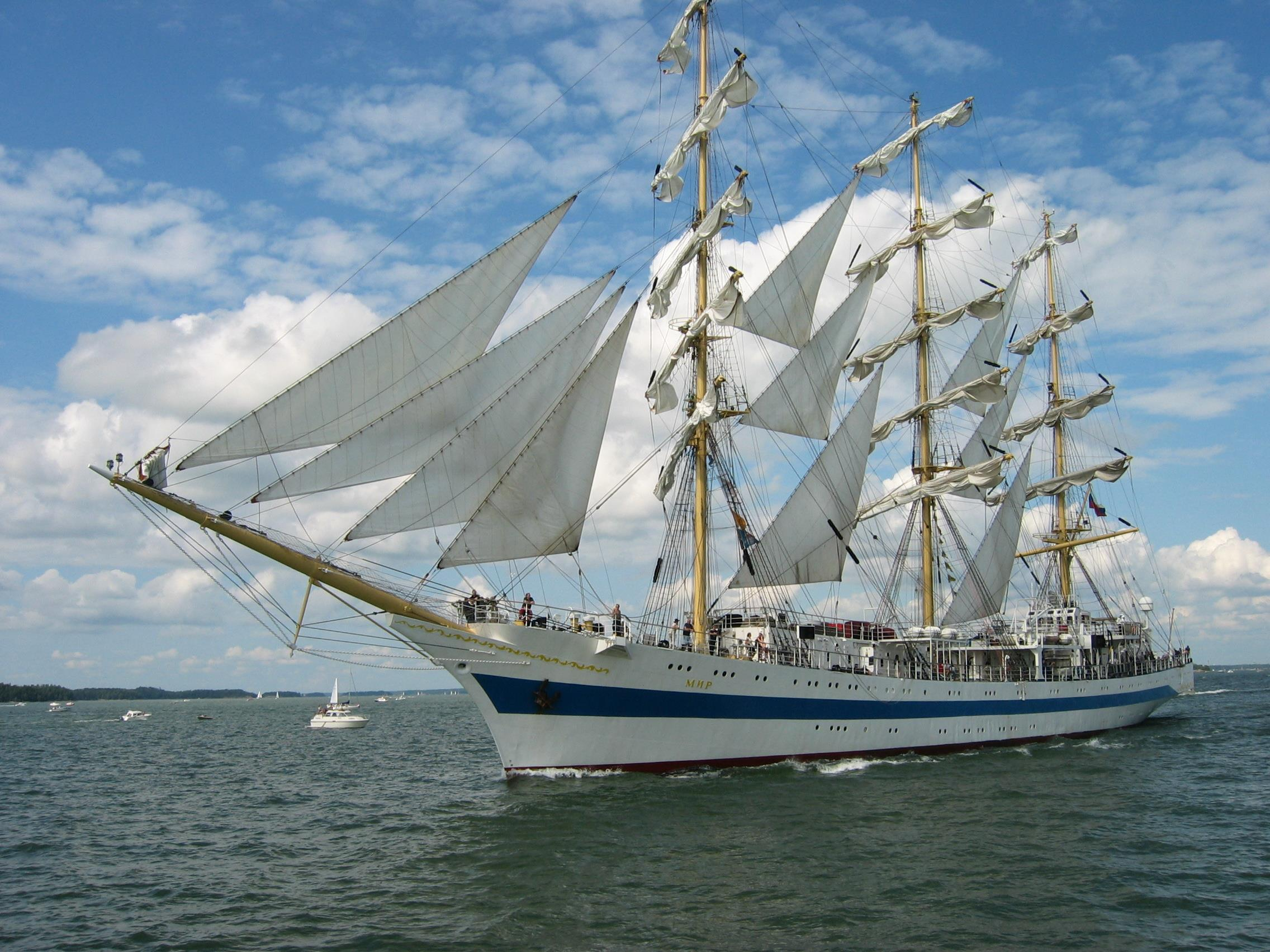
Mir

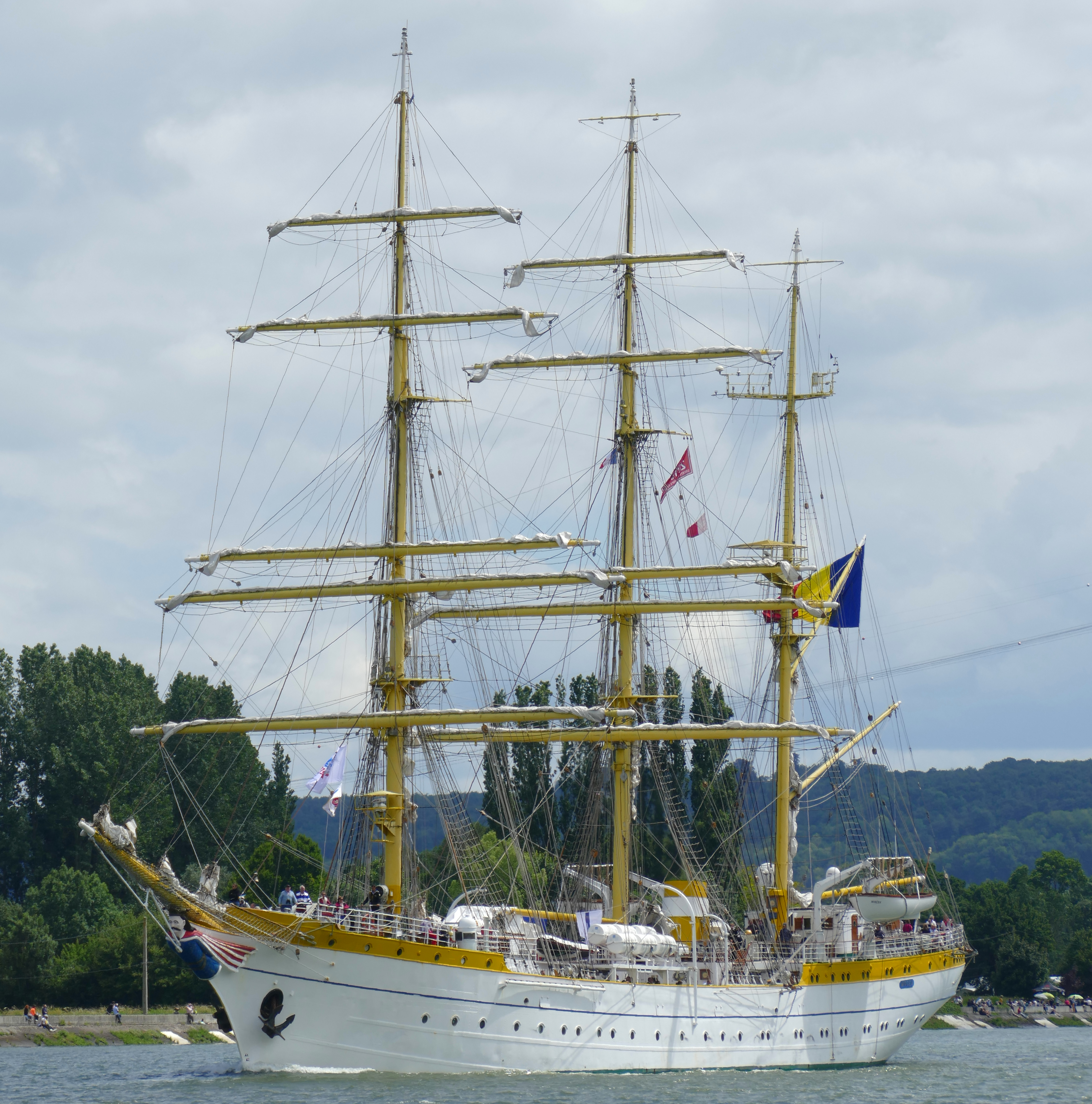
Mircea

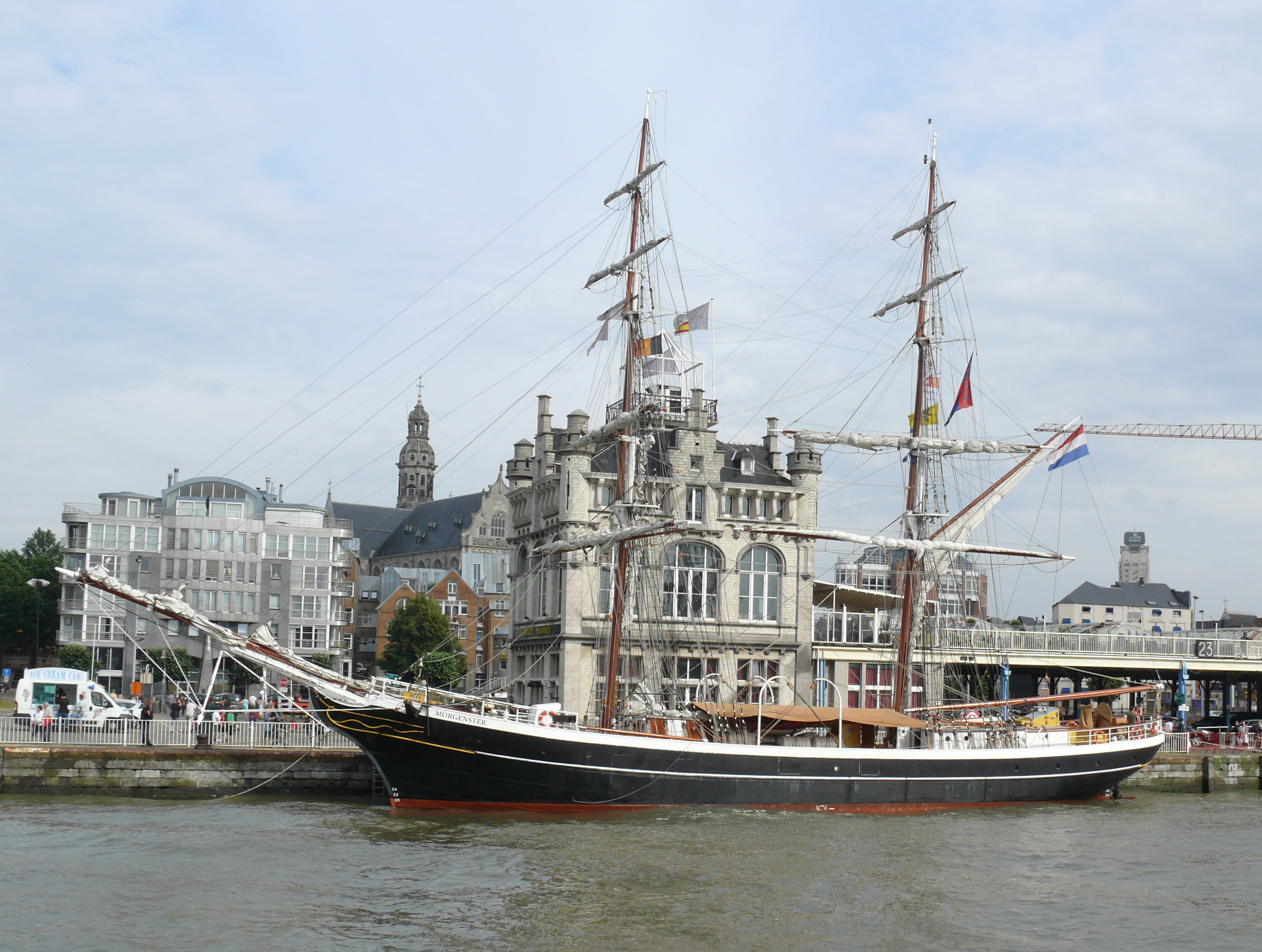
Morgenster

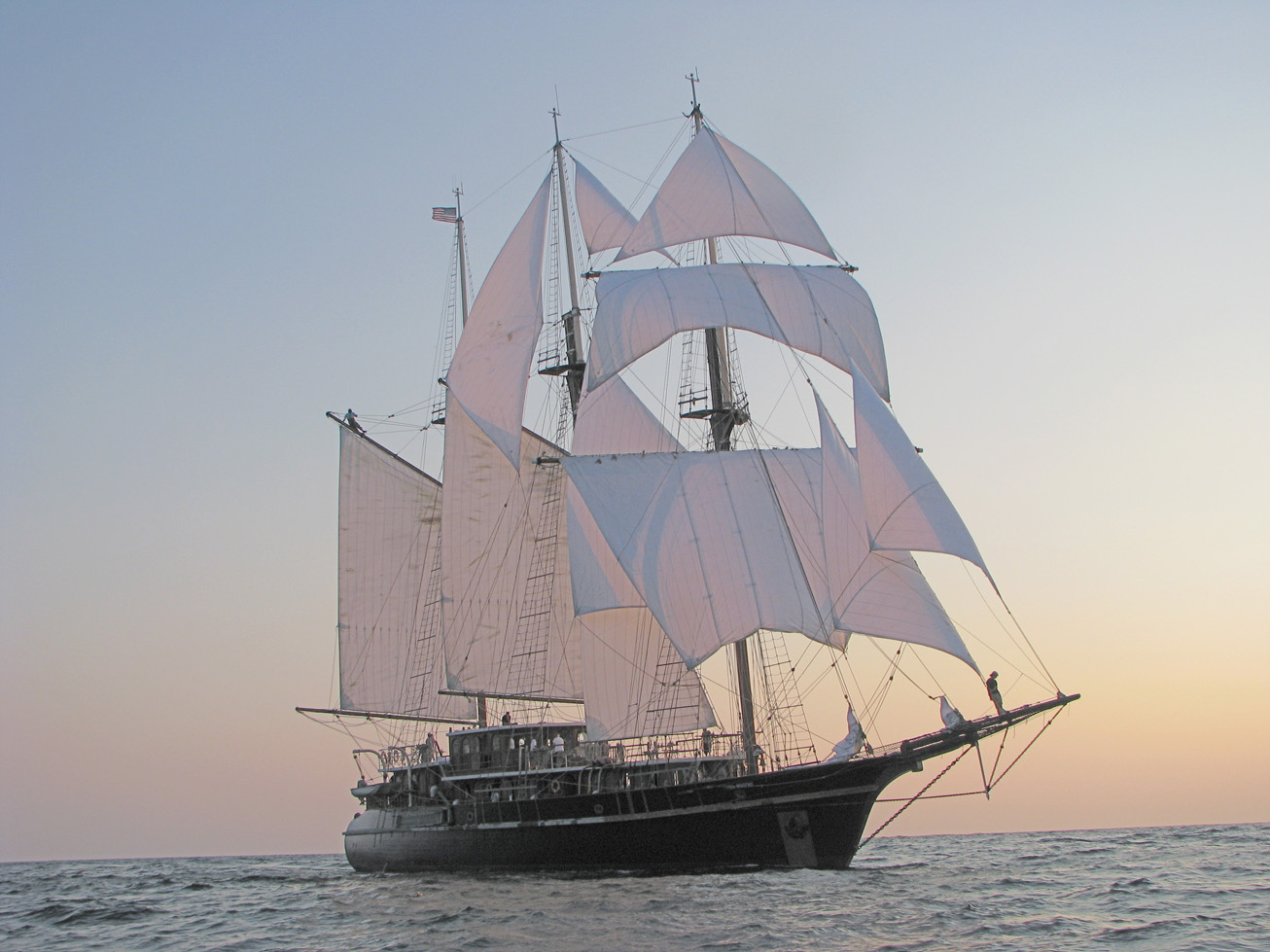
Peacemaker

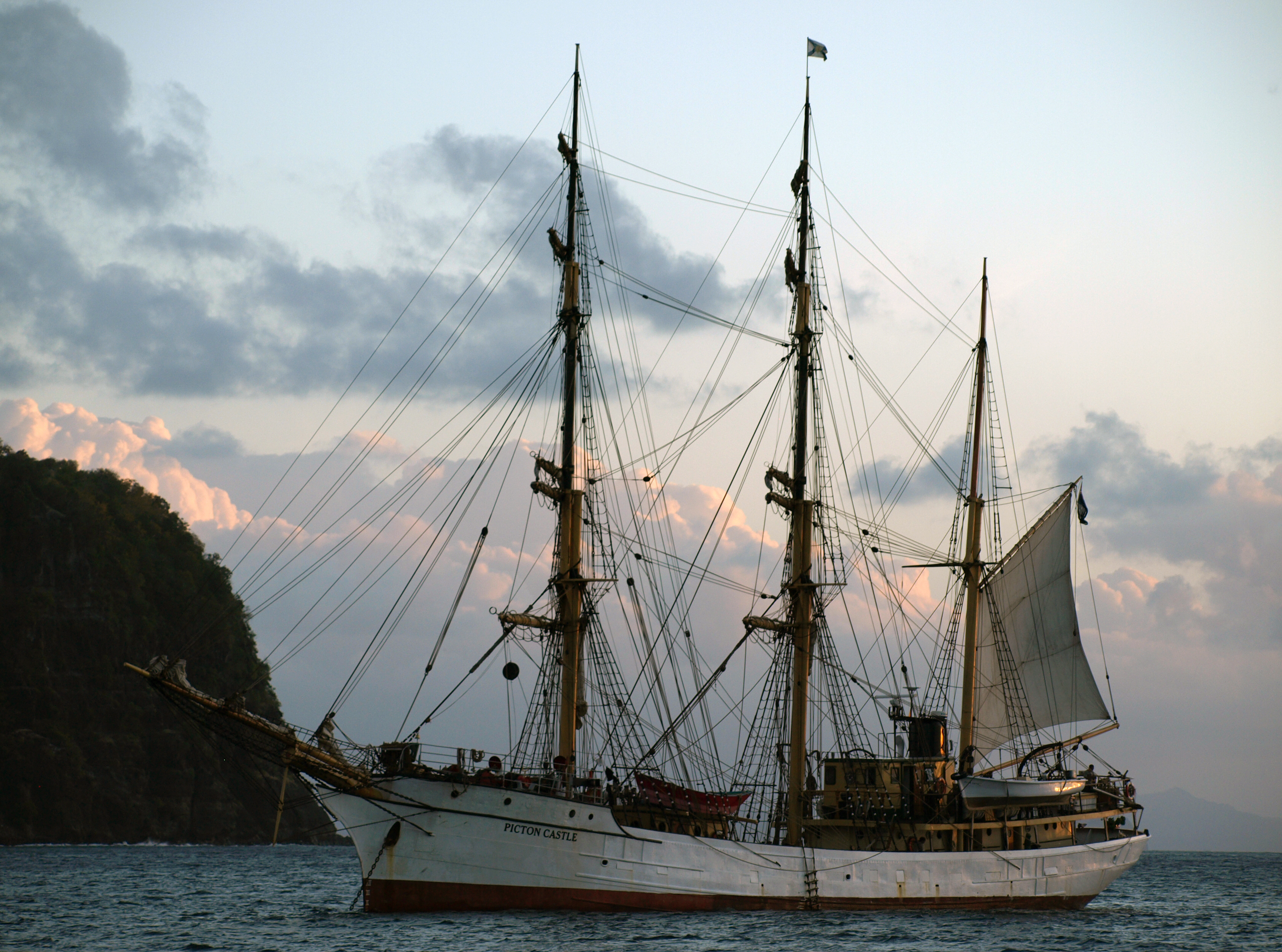
Picton Castle

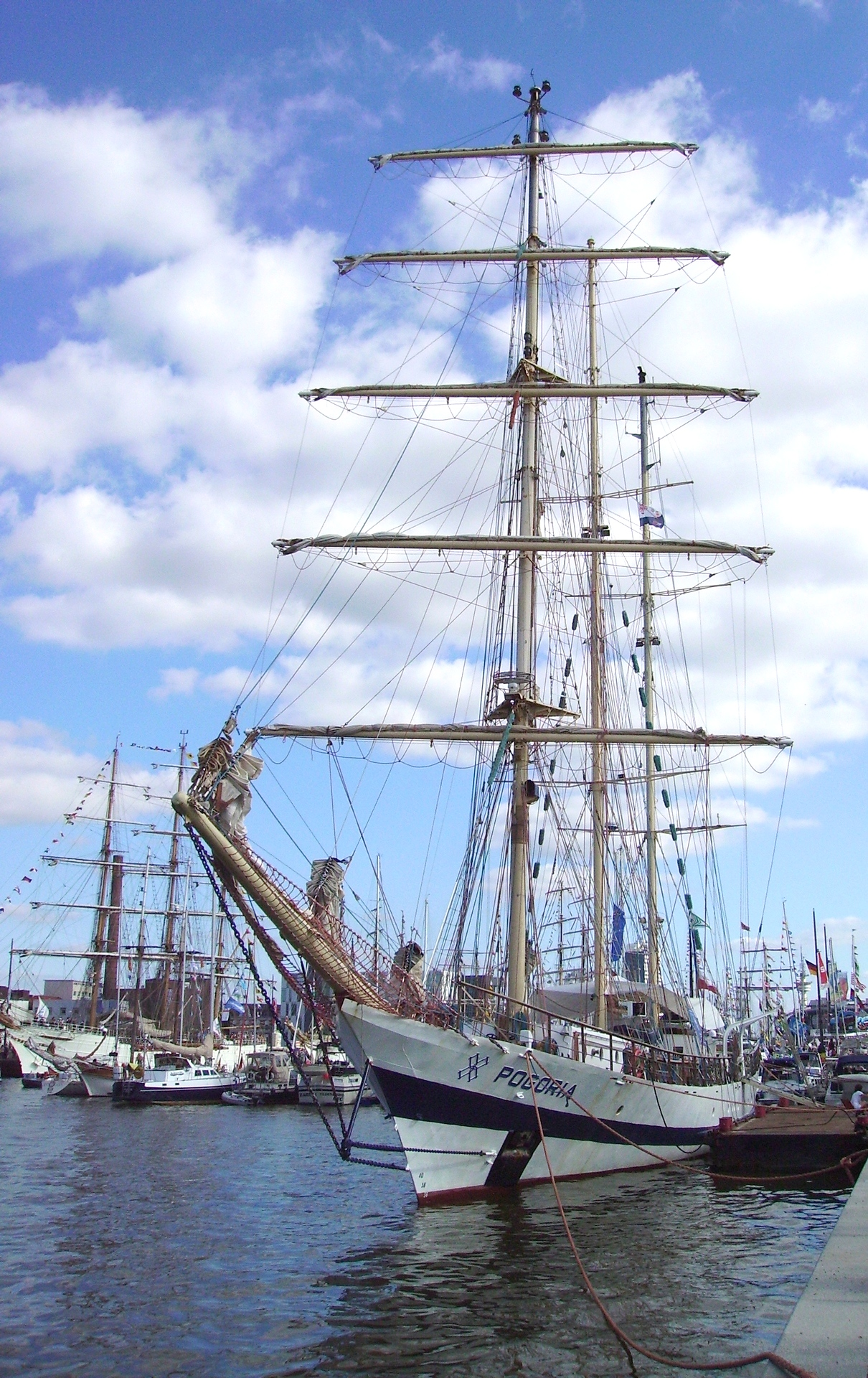
Pogoria

Rah Naward

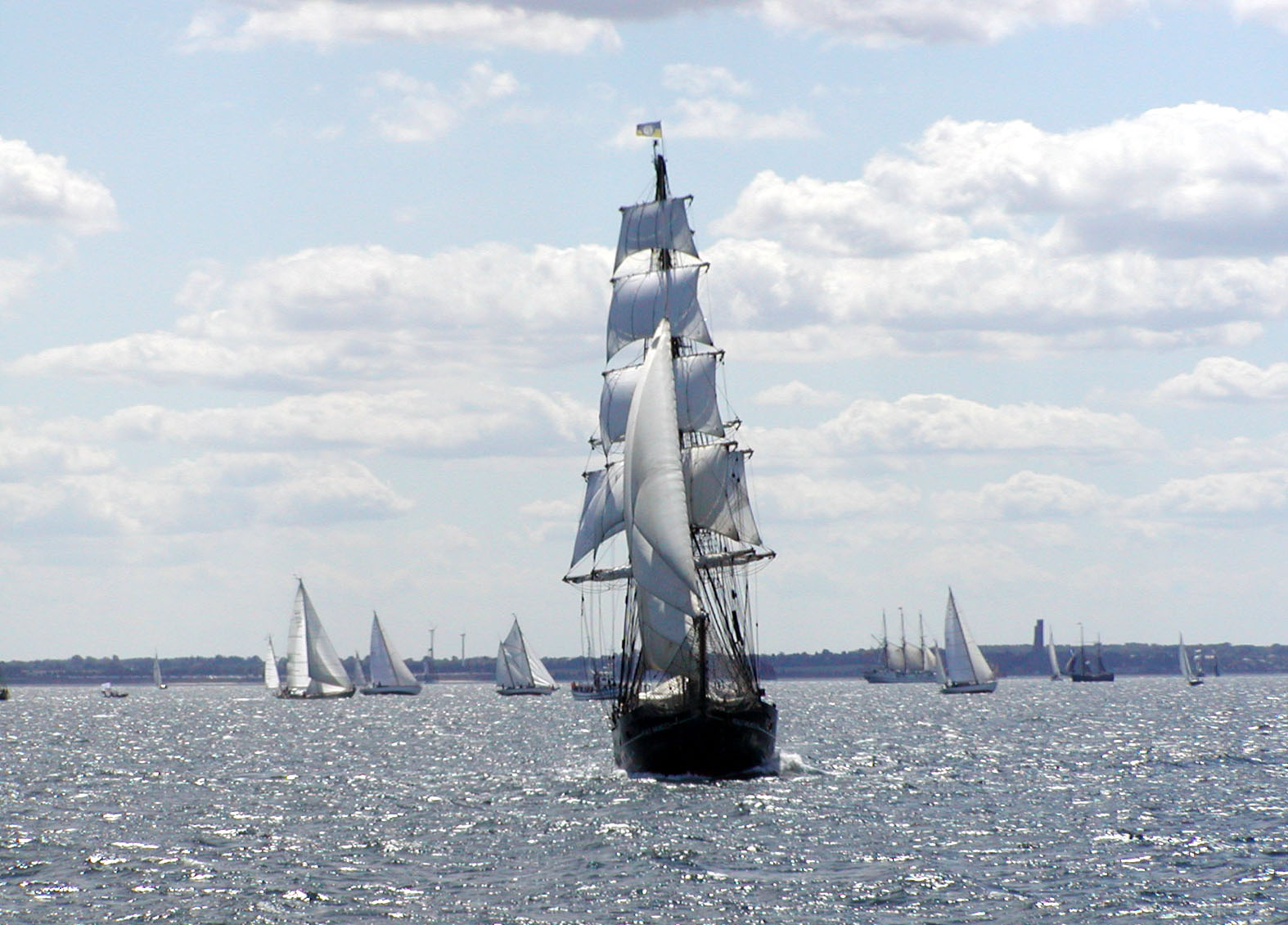
Roald Amundsen

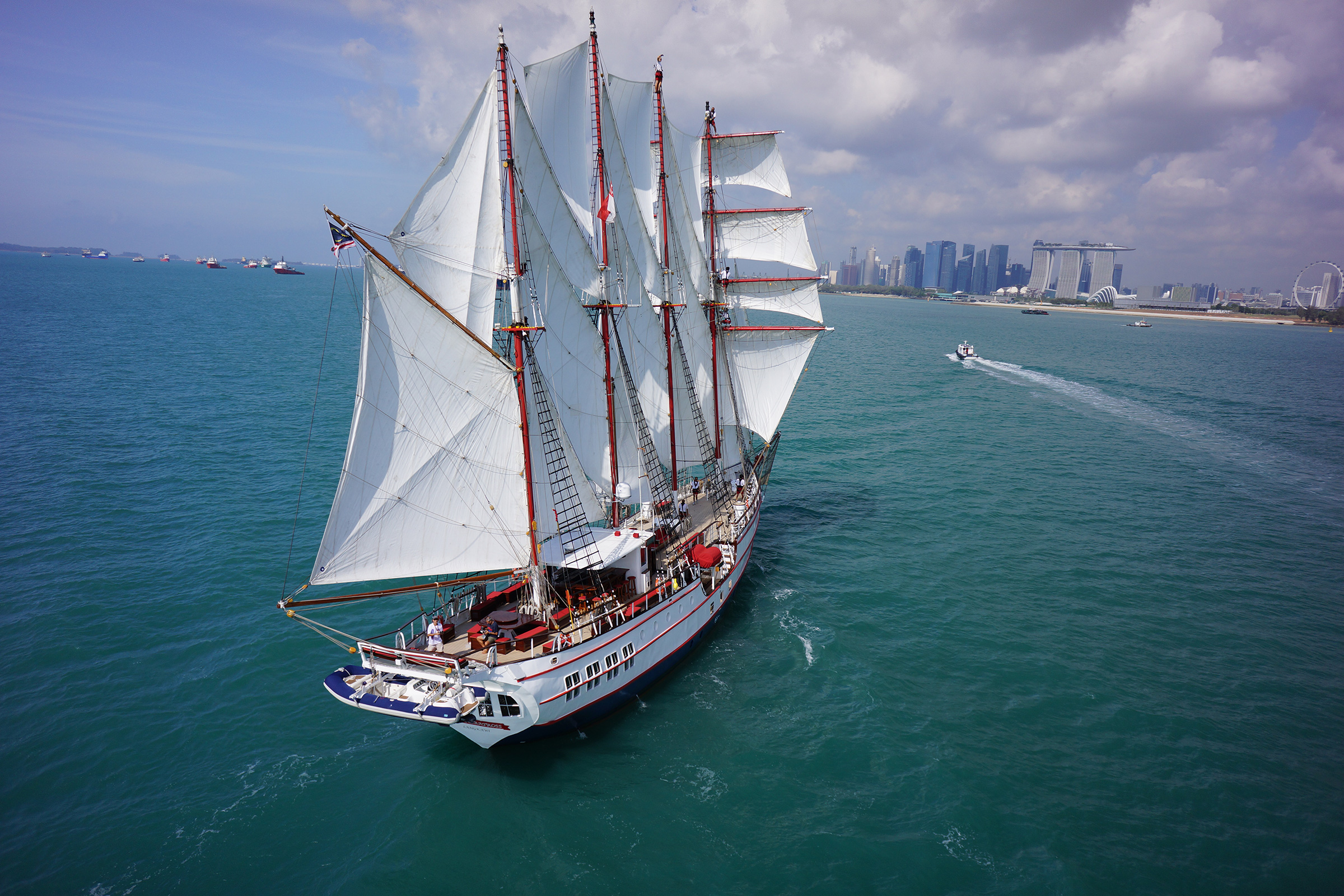
Royal Albatross

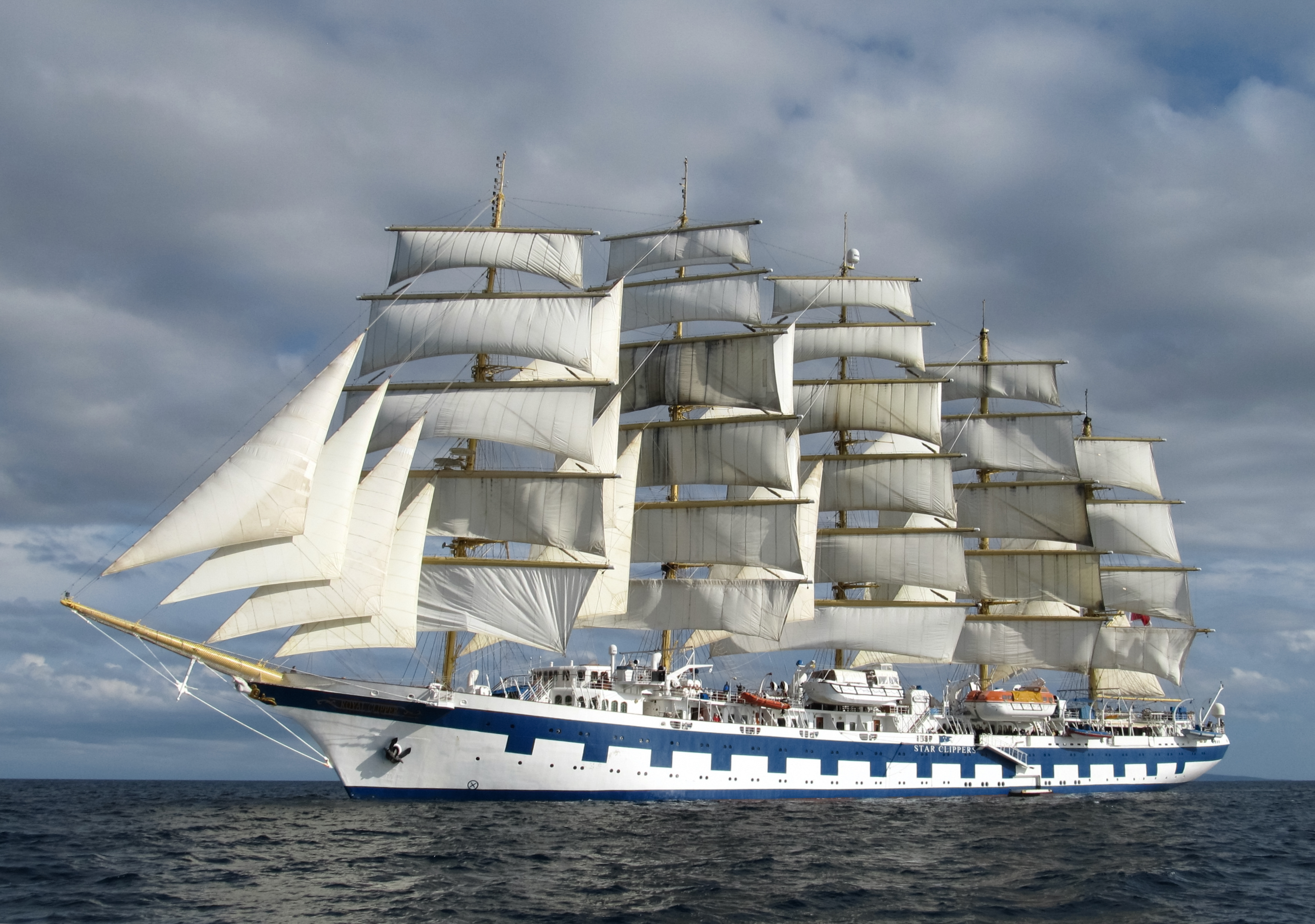
Royal Clipper

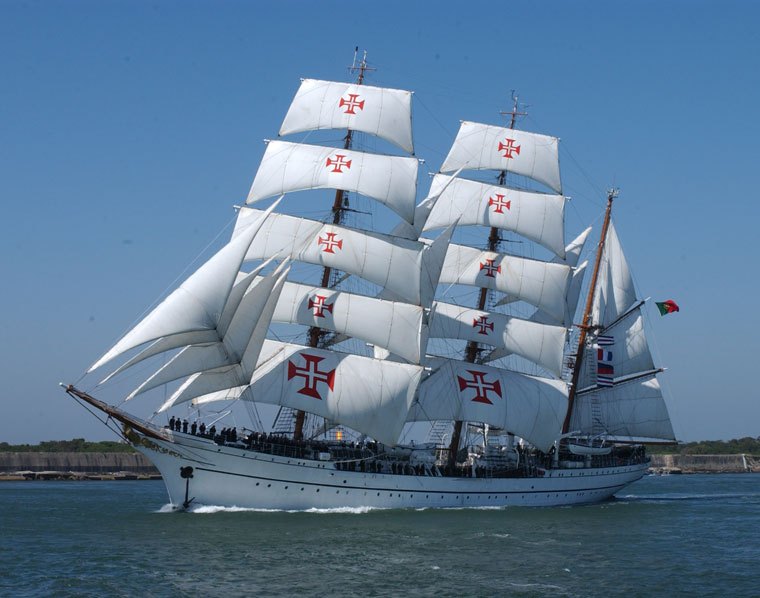
N.R.P. Sagres

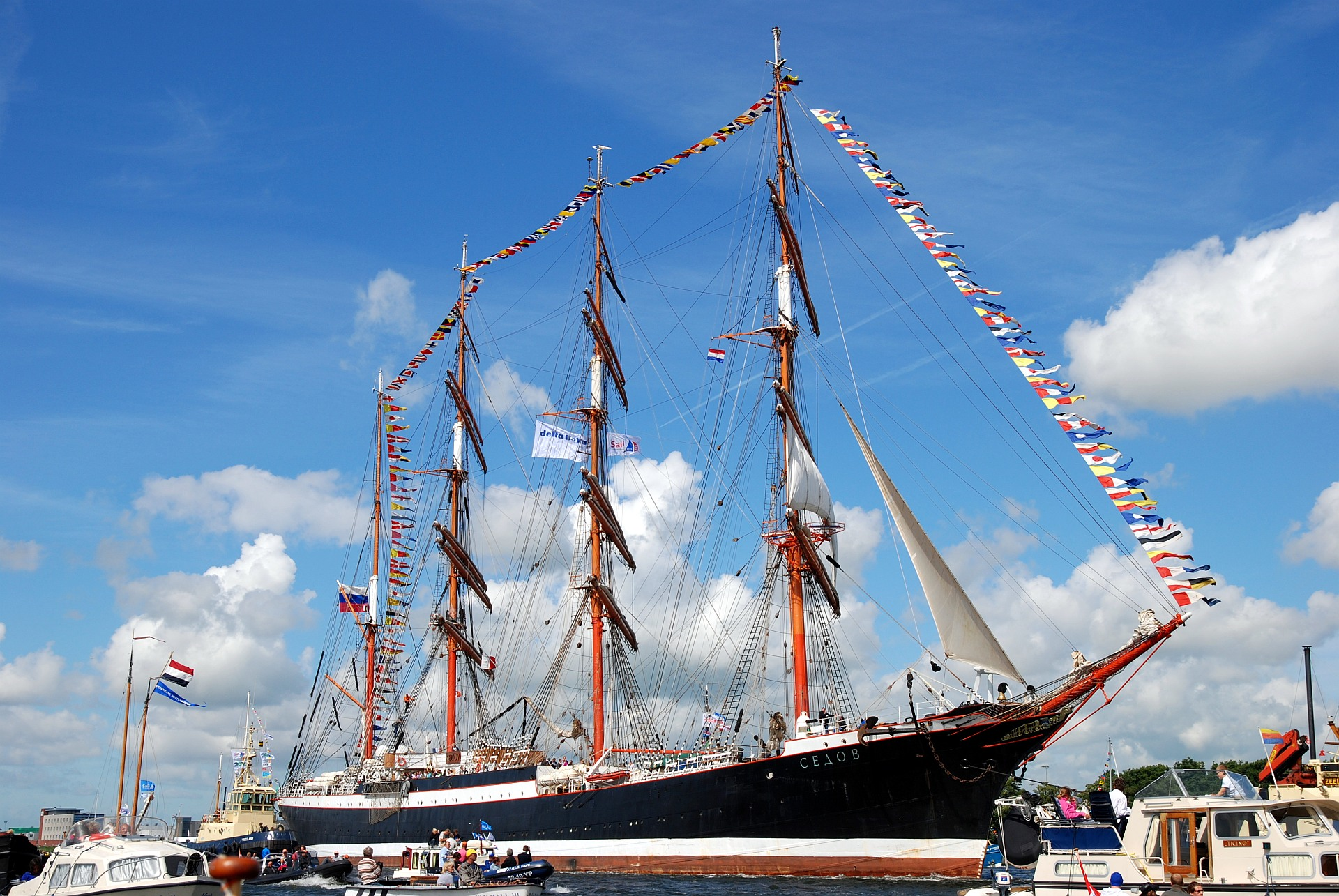
STS Sedov

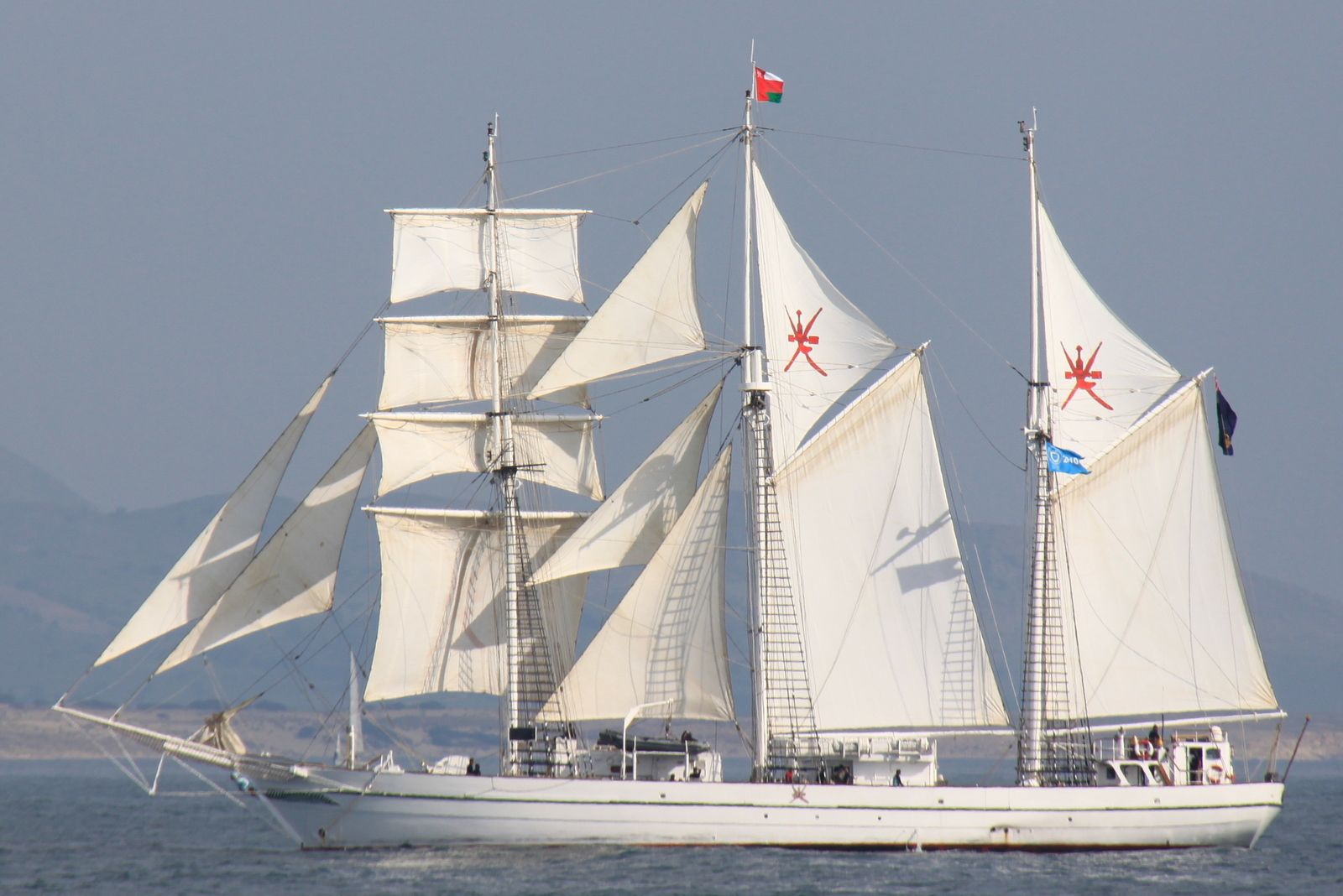
Shabab Oman

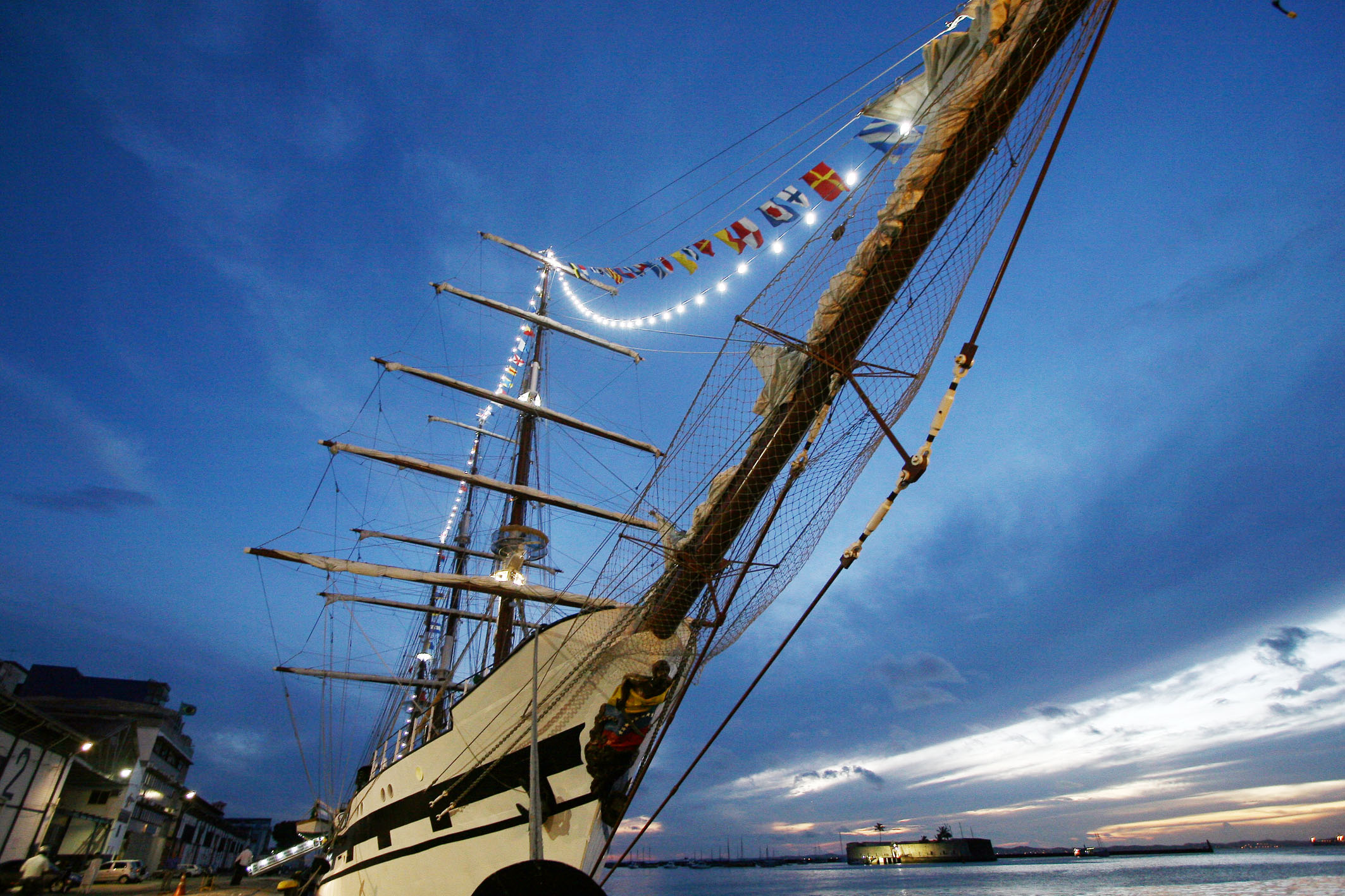
Simón Bolívar

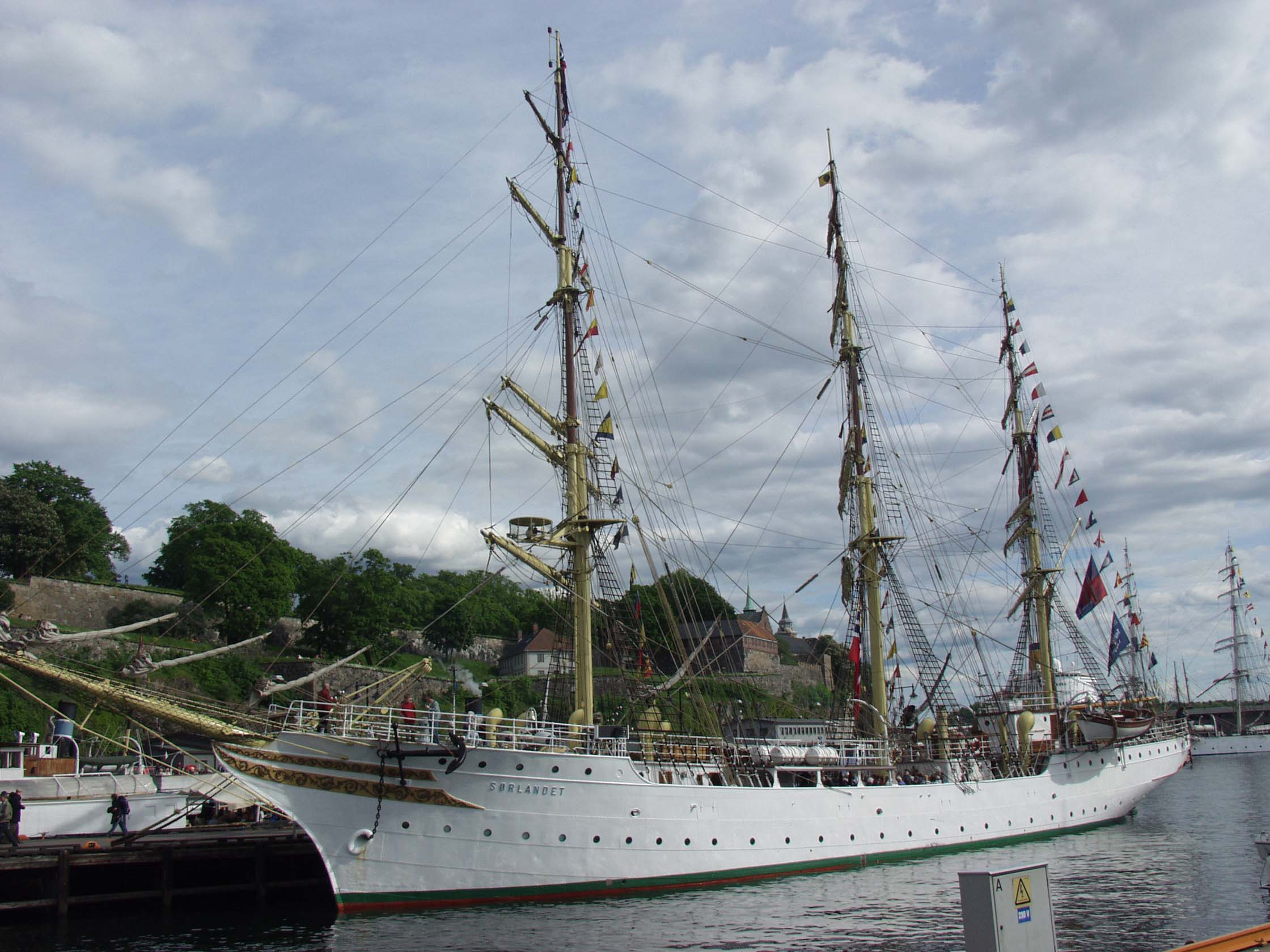
Sørlandet

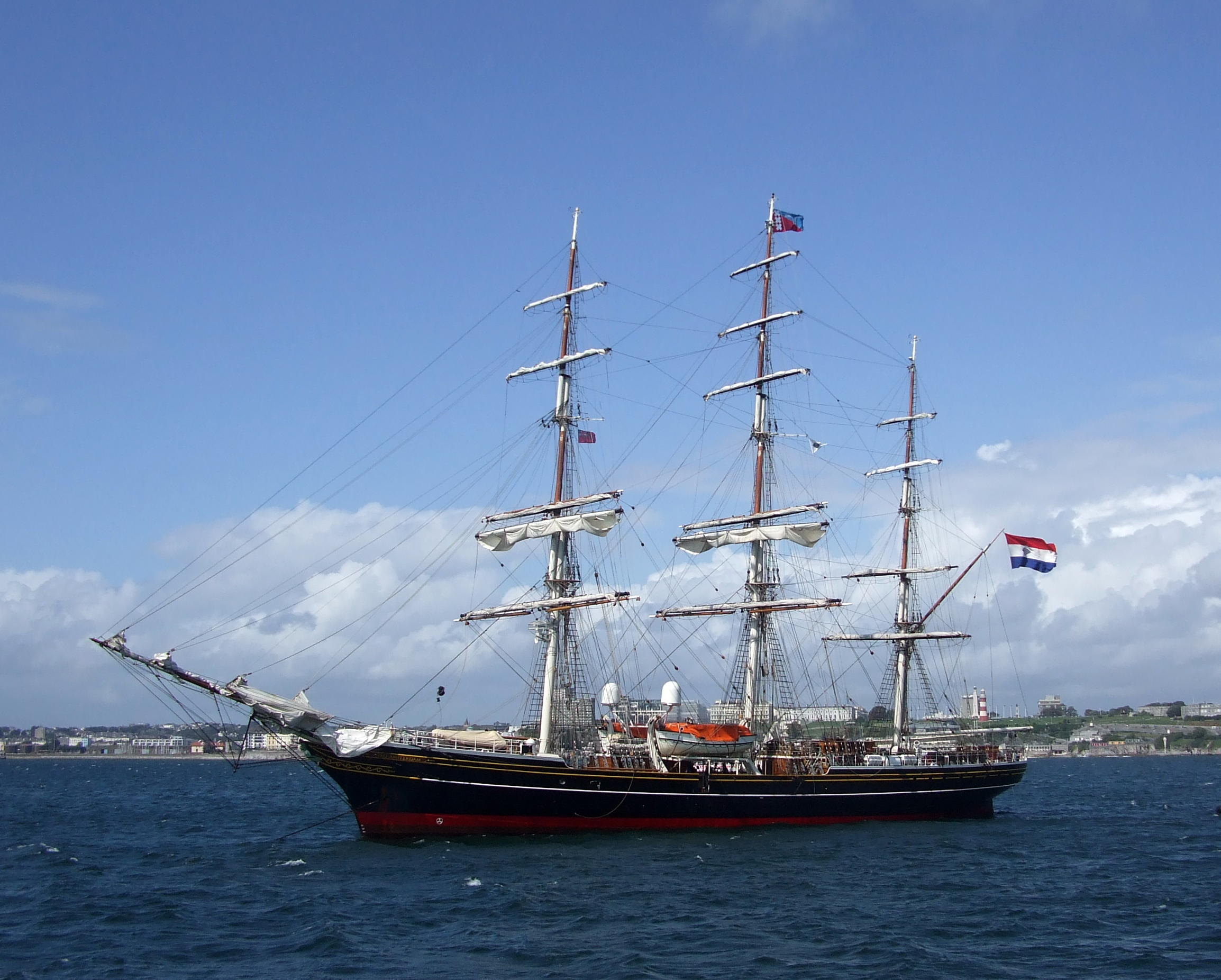
Stad Amsterdam

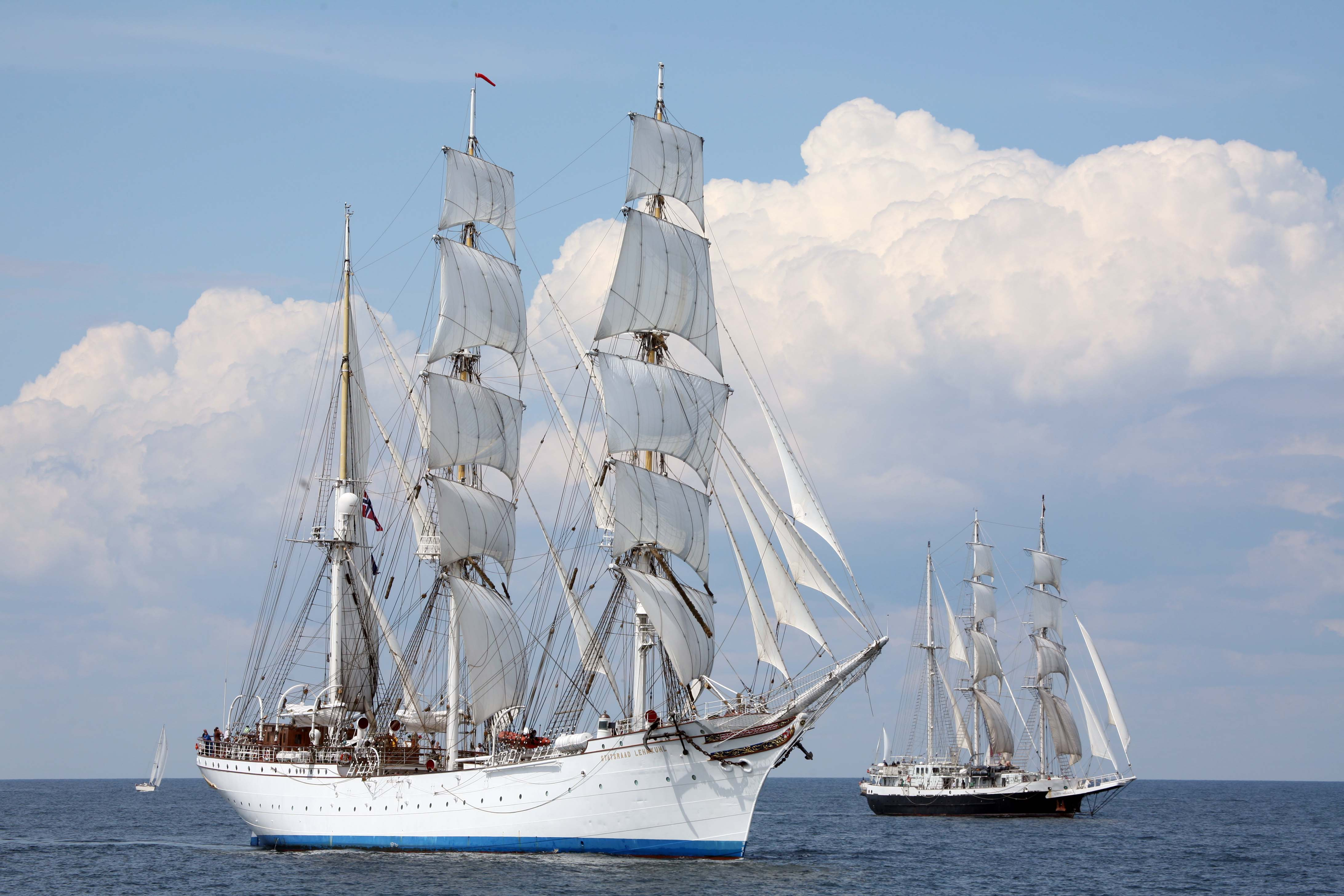
Statsraad Lehmkuhl

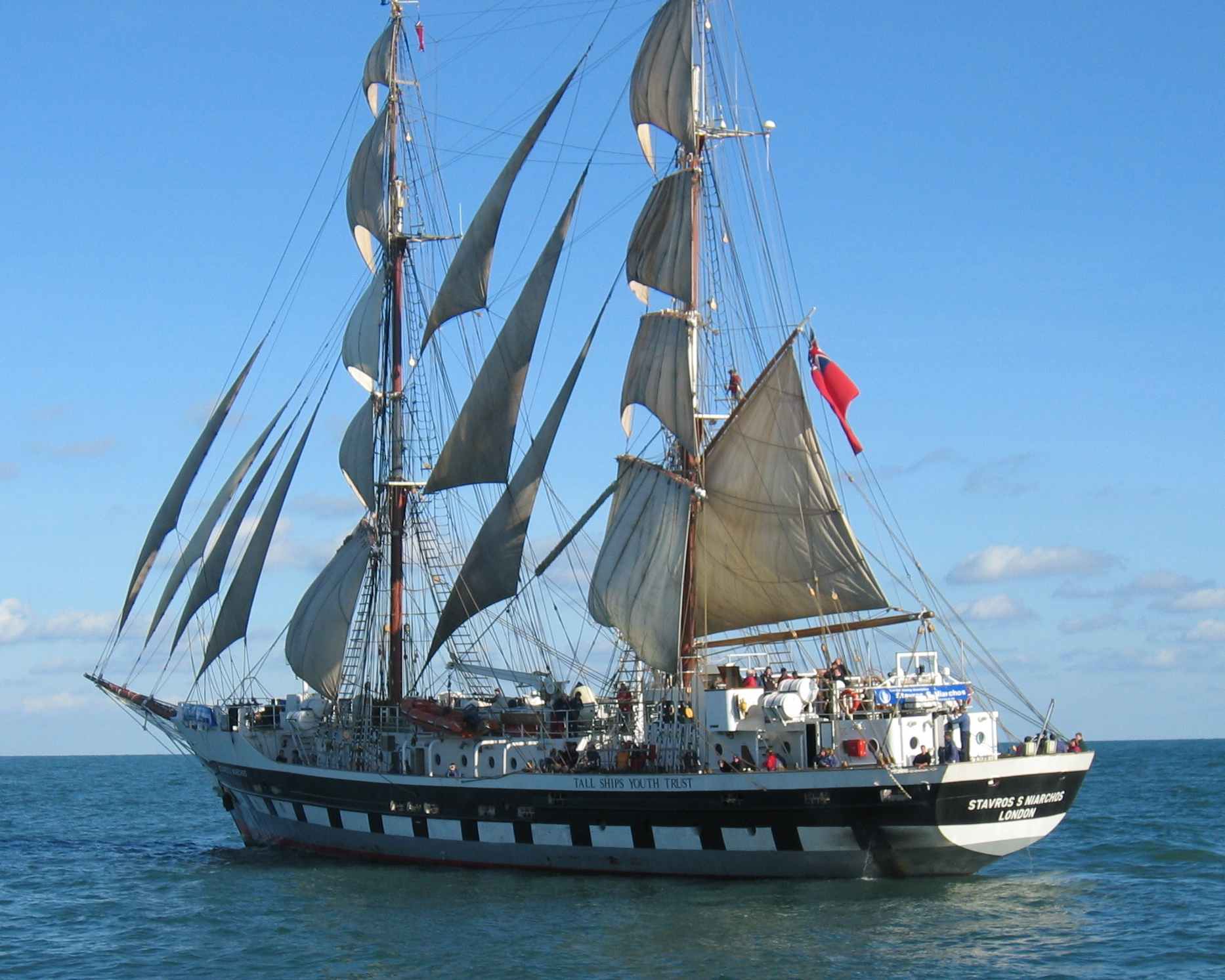
Stavros S Niarchos

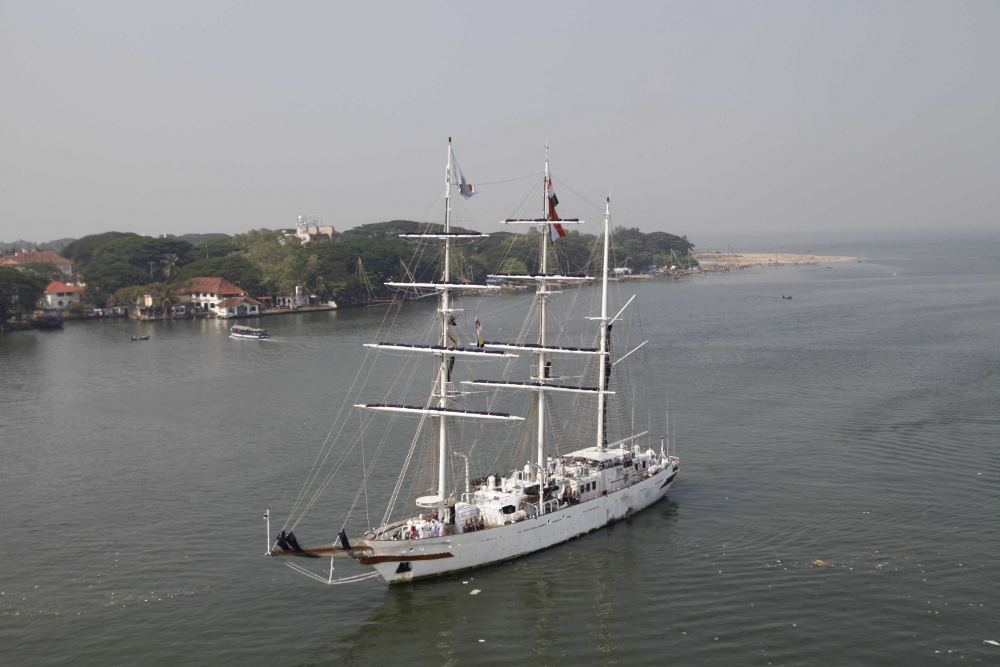
INS Sudarshini

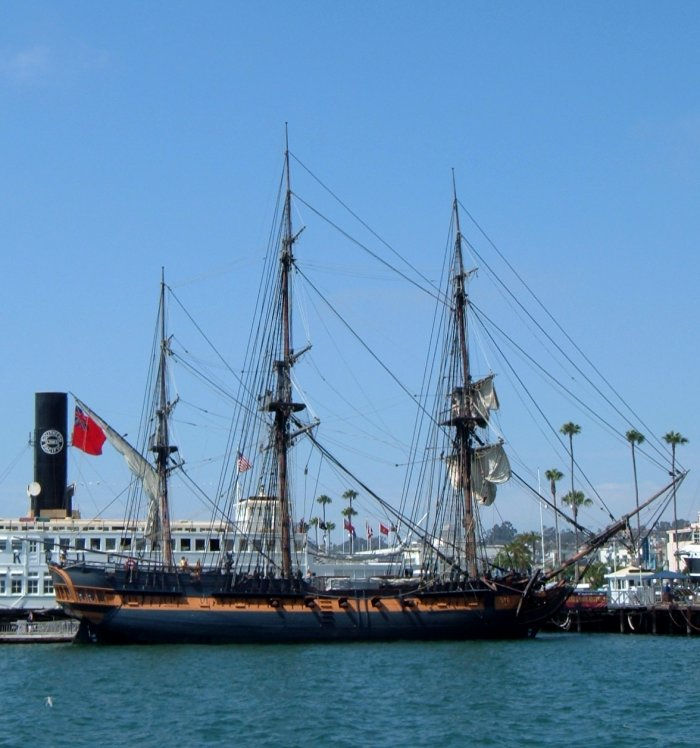
HMS Surprise

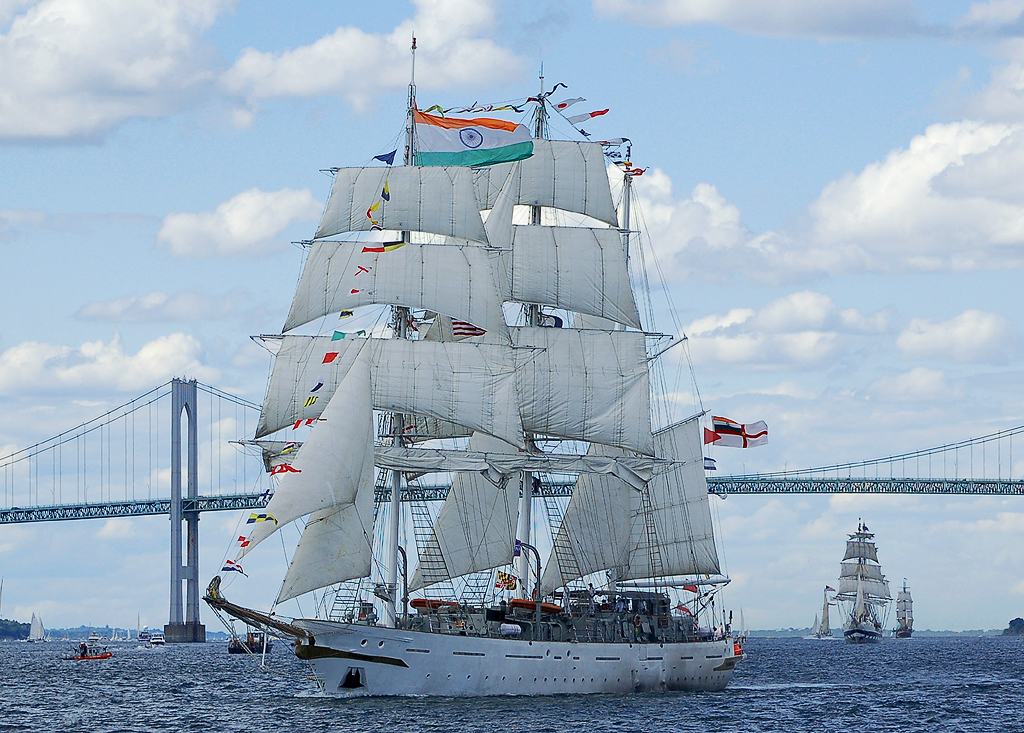
INS Tarangini

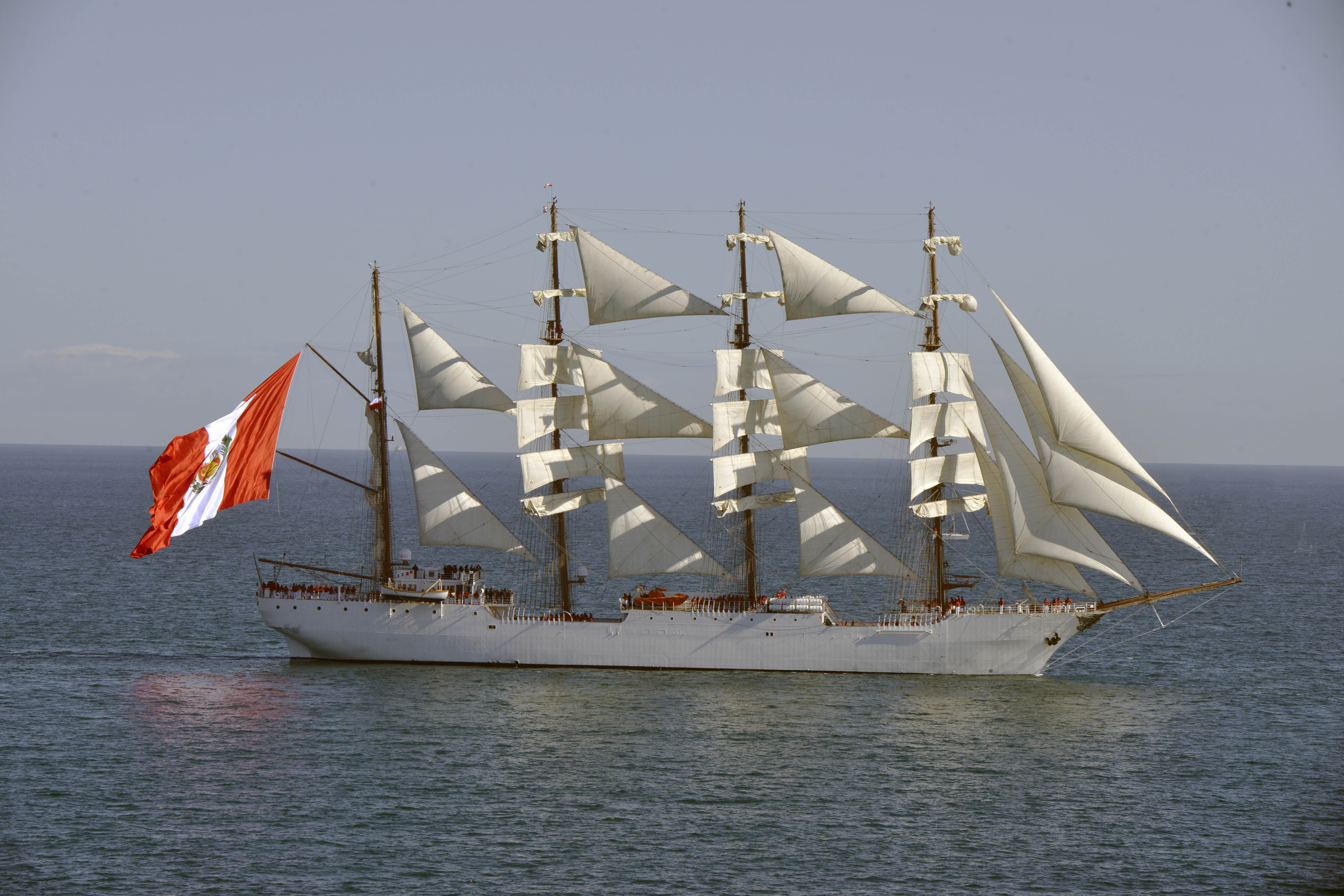
BAP Unión

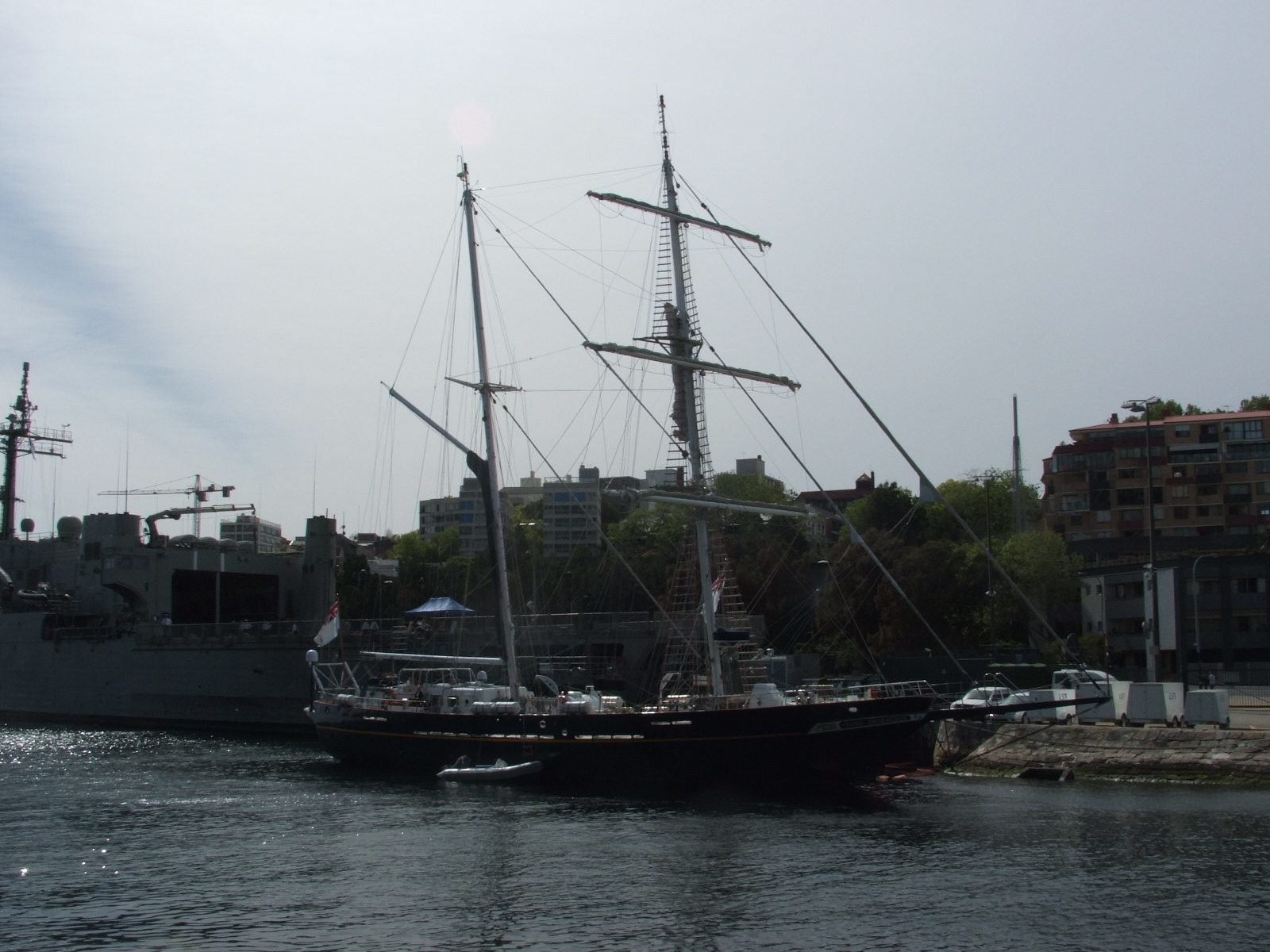
STS Young Endeavour

== See also ==
- American Sail Training Association
- Cutty Sark Tall Ships' Race
- Iron-hulled sailing ship
- Jubilee Sailing Trust
- List of large sailing vessels
- Operation Sail
- Sail training
- SAIL Amsterdam
- Tall Ships Challenge
- Tall Ship Chronicles
- Tall Ships Youth Trust
- The Tall Ships' Races
- Windjammer
