= Ramage & Ferguson =

Scottish shipyard

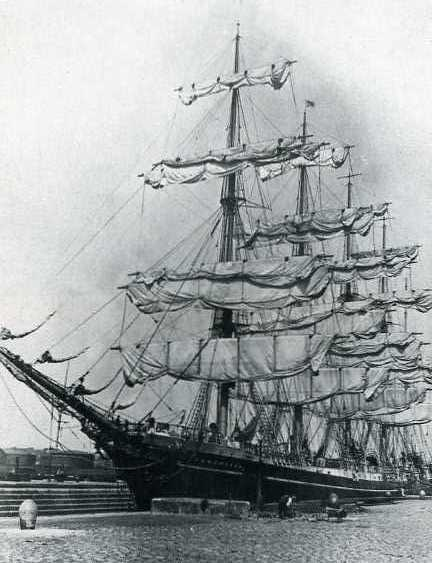
København in port

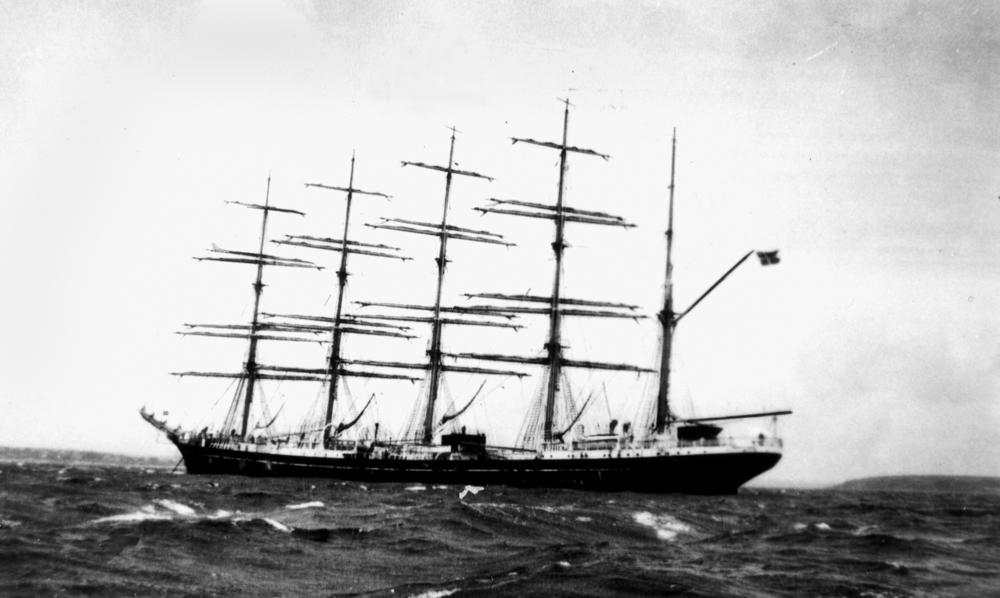
København at sea

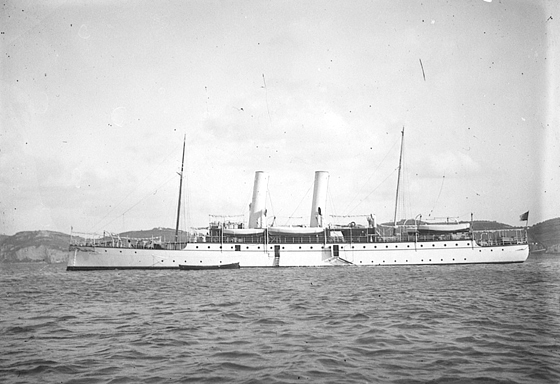
Amelia IV

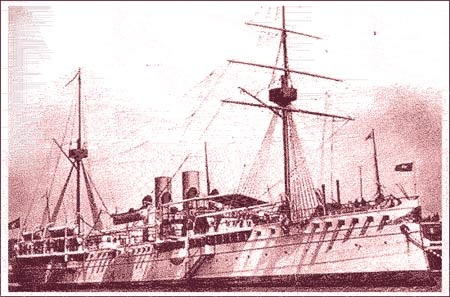
SY Maha Chakri

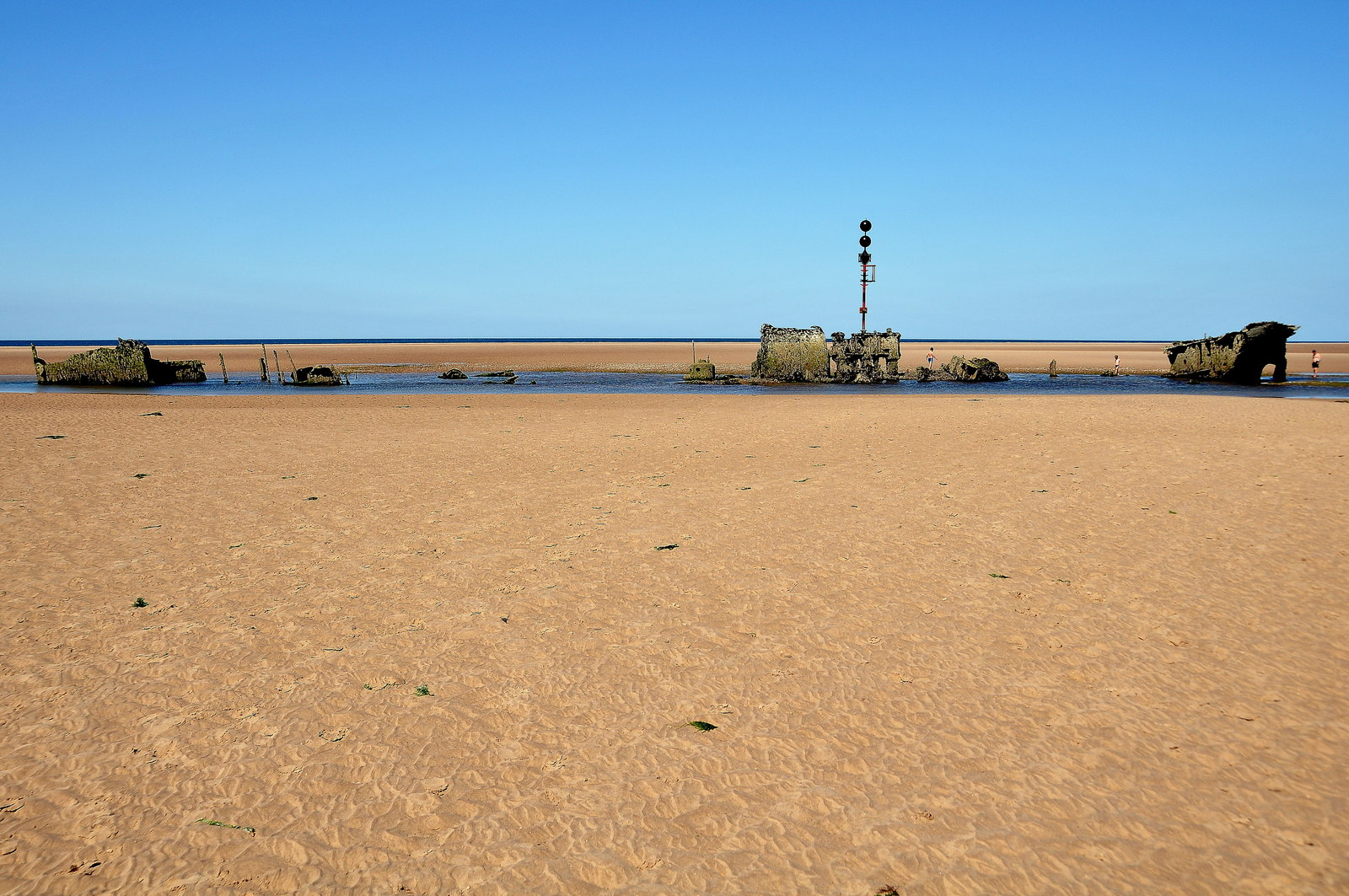
Vina, The Brancaster wreck

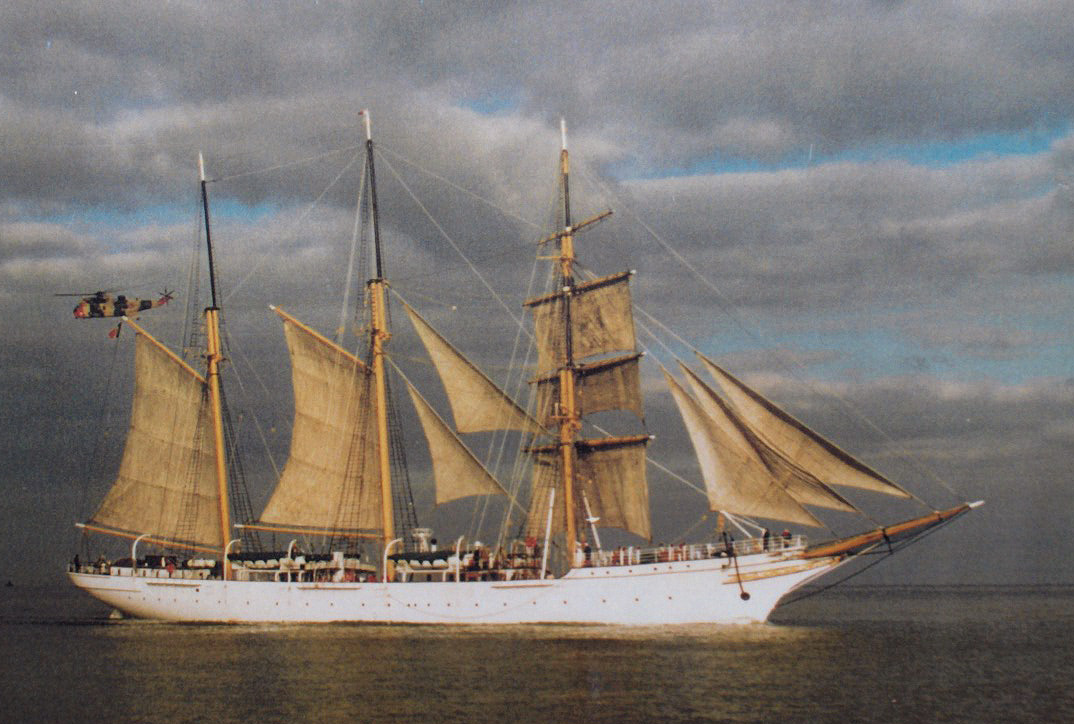
Mercator at sea

Ramage & Ferguson was a Scottish shipbuilder active from 1877 to 1934, who specialised in luxury steam yachts, usually with steel hulls and timber decks. They also made several notable windjammers, including the five-masted København.

== History ==
The company was formed in May 1877 in the outer harbour area of the Water of Leith on the west side of the Shore in Leith, backing onto the then relatively new Victoria Dock. Ships were launched into the Water of Leith, greatly limiting the maximum size of ship capable of launch. Production moved from iron to steel in 1880 and major expansions were made in 1892. The company gained a reputation for building luxury steam yachts for wealthy customers. They also built tramp steamships, and various medium-sized ships for the East India trade.

The "Ferguson" of Ramage & Ferguson is elusive and seems to have been a silent and unidentified partner. Probably the funder of the venture, there is some indication that Ferguson may have been Robert McNair Ferguson or connected to him in some way.

In the First World War the company built two hospital ships for the Admiralty.

In 1918 their yard manager, Henry Robb, left to form his own rival shipbuilding company in Leith. In 1934 Ramage & Ferguson got into financial difficulty, and Henry Robb & Sons bought out Ramage & Ferguson as a secondary yard. The yard was used up until the 1970s, and cleared of buildings in 1985. The slipway remained intact until around 1995 when it was built over to form a section of the Water of Leith Walkway. The position is still visible from the eastern bank.

== Richard Ramage ==
Richard Ramage was born on 28 June 1834 in or near Glasgow. He was apprenticed to William Denny and Brothers in Dumbarton around 1848, where he learnt his skills as a shipbuilder. In 1877 he moved to Edinburgh and founded Ramage & Ferguson.

In 1900 he was living at The Hawthorns, 212 Ferry Road, in Leith. By this time he had retired and passed the business to his son, Alexander Gulliland Ramage.

Richard Ramage died on 16 July 1920, and is buried in Warriston Cemetery. The grave is on the sloping diagonal path leading from the lower vaults to the now-sealed eastern entrance.

== Alexander Gulliland Ramage ==
Alexander Gulliland Ramage is thought to have been born in or near Glasgow around 1870. He was the son of Richard Ramage and his wife, Elizabeth Ogilvie Gulliland (b.1836). He took over from his father Richard Ramage as partner and managing director of Ramage & Ferguson around 1895. His younger brother John Thomson Ramage (1885–1933) acted as his assistant and design engineer.

In 1899 he was elected a fellow of the Royal Society of Edinburgh. His proposers were Bruce Peebles, Ralph Stockman, Robert McNair Ferguson, and Sir Francis Grant Ogilvie. At this time he lived at 9 Derby Street in the Newhaven district of Edinburgh.

By 1910 he was living in a larger house at 8 Western Terrace in Edinburgh's West End. He lived at Lochcote Cottage near Torphichen. He wrote a book, The Dynamics of Thought and Impulse, which was published in 1924. He died at Lochcote Cottage on 21 February 1954.

== Notable ships ==
See

- SS Craigrownie (1880), wrecked two months after launch
- SY Iolanthe (1881), later renamed Iolaire, which was wrecked off Stornoway in 1919.
- SS Craigallion (1881), later renamed Ozama, with a very colourful history in USA
- SY Mount Carmel (1883), wrecked on Florida coast in 1916
- SY Merrie England (1883)
- SPWS Henry Vinn (1885), paddle steamer
- SS Castor (1886), three-masted barque for John S. Croudace of Dundee, sold to G. Gordon & Co in 1895 broken up in 1911
- Crown of India (1886), a four-masted barque sunk by a U-boat in 1915
- SY Rondine (1887), for Prince Serignano of Naples, later renamed SY Sultana when sold to King Leopold II, King of the Belgians
- SS Fatshan, for the China Navigation Company, scrapped 1933
- SS Ancona (1888), for Currie Line of Leith, sunk by a U-boat in 1915
- SS Ravenna (1888), sister ship to the Ancona for the Currie Line, sunk by a U-boat in 1917
- SS Weimar (1889), steam packet for the Currie Line, scrapped 1933
- SY Semiramis (1889) for John Lysaght later renamed SY Narada when owned by Henry Walters of Baltimore
- SS Zamora (1889), sister ship of Weimar
- SS Orion (1890), a sister ship of Castor for John S. Croudace, sold to J. Wilson in 1895, wrecked 1906
- SS Trade Winds (1891), steel four-mast barque; renamed SS Magdalene in 1899 and renamed Ophelia in 1914
- SS Drumrock (1891), steel four-mast barque built for Gillison & Chadwick in Liverpool; sold to F. Laeisz in 1899, sank near Vancouver in 1927
- SS Procyon (1892), for John S. Croudace, sold to J. Wilson in 1895, sold to Russia in 1910
- SY Maha Chakri (1892), magnificent ship for the King of Siam, Rama V
- CS Norseman (1892), Transatlantic cable-laying ship, scrapped in 1925
- RSY Valhalla (1892), a fully rigged steam yacht built for Joseph Laycock, later owned by James Lindsay, 26th Earl of Crawford. Placed third in the Kaiser's Transatlantic Race of 1905.
- SS Vala (1893), for Salvesen & Co, one of the first ships with a bronze propeller
- SY Cleopatra (1893) for John Lysaght sold to US Navy in 1898 as USS Yankton
- SS Vina (1893), sister ship of Vala, purchased in 1944 by the Ministry of War for target practice (still extant - known as the Brancaster Wreck)
- SS Royal Forth (c.1895), 3,000 ton four-master sold to Schmidt of Hamburg around 1905 renamed Henriette. Passed to Italy in 1919. Broken 1924
- SY Gunilda (1897), for William L. Harkness, sank in Lake Superior in 1911 (well preserved in water)
- SY Surf (1898) for F D Lambert of United States, used for running liquor during prohibition
- SY Banshee (1901) later renamedAmélia IV (1905), for the King of Portugal
- SY Rosabelle (1902), for Theodore Pim, later requisitioned by the Admiralty, and sunk by U-374 in December 1941
- SS Vienna (1903), for the Currie Line
- SY Lorena (1903), a steam yacht made for the American ″Asphalt King″ Amzi L. Barber, and named for his daughter. Sold to George Jay Gould in 1907 and renamed SY Atalanta
- SS Palmella (1920), part of the re-equipping of the Ellerman Wilson Line who had heavy losses in the First World War
- SY København (1921), for the Danish government. The largest sailing ship ever built in Britain. Lost at sea in 1928.
- SMY Naz Perwer (1923), a steam yacht for Prince Youssouf Kamal of Egypt
- SS Vyner Brooke (1928), for the Rajah of Sarawak, named after Sir Charles Vyner Brooke
- Mercator (1934), a barquentine for the Belgian government. R&F's final ship; now a museum ship at Ostend.
