= Mercator (ship) =

1932 barquentine

Coordinates: 51°13′38″N 2°55′14″E

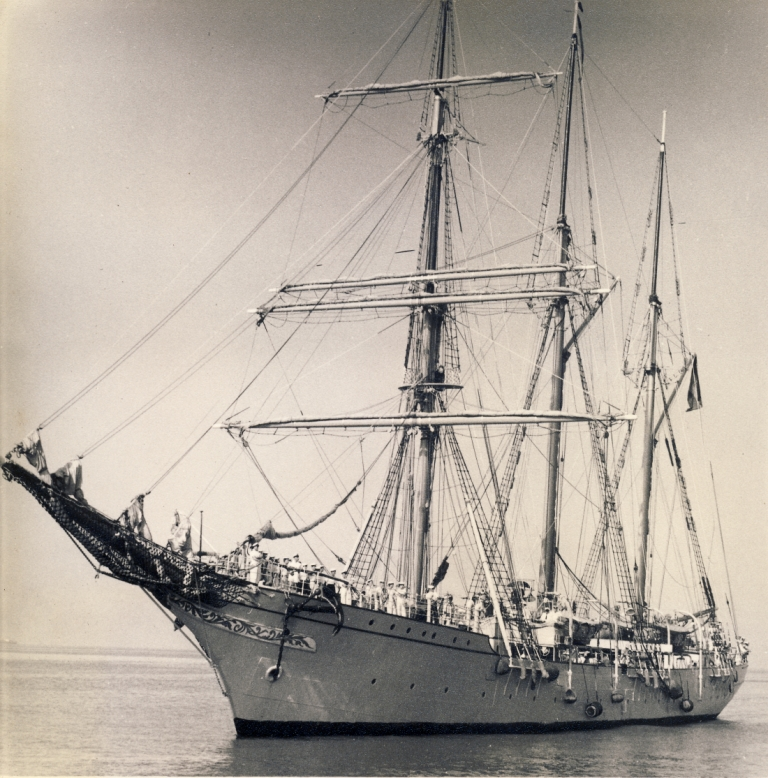
- Mercator visiting Trinidad, c. 1960

History

Belgium
- Name: Mercator
- Namesake: Gerardus Mercator
- Builder: Ramage & Ferguson Ltd, Leith, Scotland
- Launched: 1932
- Status: Museum ship

General characteristics
- Tonnage: 770 gross tons
- Length: 78.5 m (258 ft) overall; 68 m (223 ft) hull length
- Beam: 10.6 m (35 ft)
- Height: foremast 39 m (128 ft); mainmast 41 m (135 ft); mizzenmast 40 metres (130 ft)
- Draft: 5.1 m (17 ft)
- Sail plan: Three-masted barquentine, 15 sails: four jibs, four square foresails, three staysails, two spankers, two gaff topsails
- Speed: 13 knots (24 km/h; 15 mph)
- Crew: 150

Mercator is a steel-hulled barquentine built in 1932 as a training ship for the Belgian merchant fleet. She was named after Gerardus Mercator (1512–1594), a Belgian cartographer. She was designed by G.L. Watson & Co. and built in Leith, Scotland and launched in 1932.

Besides being a training ship, she was also used, mainly before World War II, for scientific observations, or as ambassador for Belgium on world fairs and in sailing events.

In 1961, she became a floating museum, first in Antwerp and, from 1964, in the marina of Ostend, just in front of the city hall. As of 2025, she remains open to visitors.

== Construction ==
Mercator was launched in 1932 as a steel-hulled barquentine, with composite rigging. The foremast carries square sails, the main mast and the mizzen mast are rigged with fore and aft-sails. Usually the Mercator carried 15 sails with a total surface of about 1,600 m^{2} (17,000 sq ft). With a fair wind she could easily make 13 knots.

== History ==
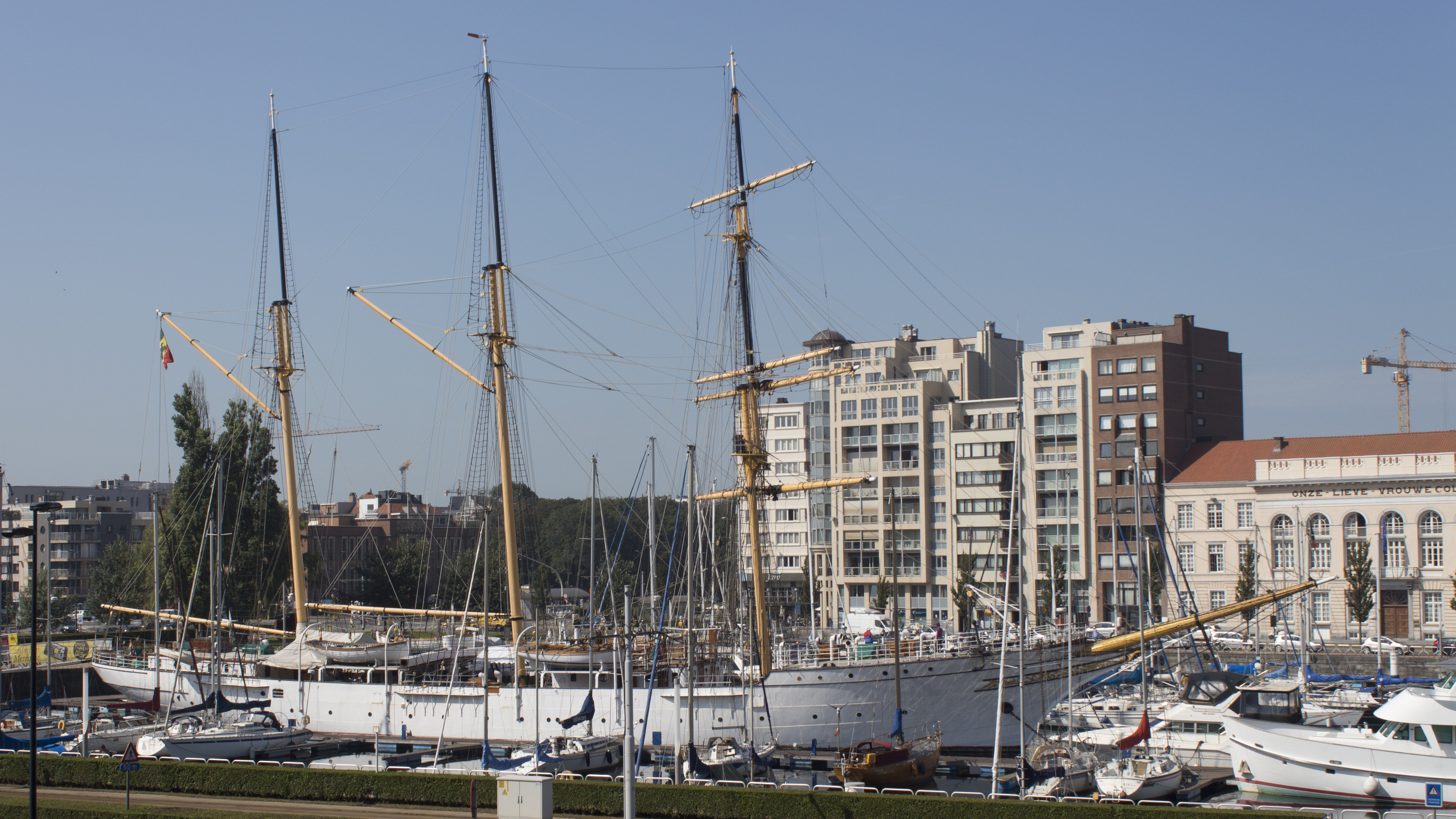
Mercator at Ostend in 2012

Mercator made her seventh cruise in 1934, sailing from Pitcairn Island, Tahiti, Papeete, to the Marquesas Islands and Honolulu for a Belgo-French scientific expedition. It proved to be a fairly remarkable one to those preceding World War II. At the end of this expedition, two of the famous Easter Island statues, that had been transported back to Europe on board the Mercator, were donated by the Chilean government, one to France and one to Belgium.

In 1936 Mercator had the honor of bringing home the remains of the Flemish missionary and apostle of the lepers, Pater Damiaan, from Molokai island in Hawaii.

On February 21, 1940, Mercator set out for her last cruise before World War II. She sailed to Rio de Janeiro and afterward arrived in Boma in the Democratic Republic of the Congo.

From early 1945 to mid 1947, the ship was under the control of the British Admiralty as a submarine depot ship. After her release from naval duties, the ship went back to Belgium to receive extensive maintenance work. On 20 January 1951, she returned to service as a training ship and completed 41 voyages, sailing almost all seas. After that she performed quite a few scientific missions. In addition she competed in Tall Ships Races from Torbay-Lisbon (1956), Brest-Canary Islands (1958) and winning line honours in the Oslo-Ostend (1960) race.

From 1932 to 1960 she had just two commanders: Captain R. Van de Sande (from 1932 till 1955), Captain R. Ghys (from 1955 till 1960).

In 1964, Mercator became a floating museum in Ostend, moored in front of the City Hall, and since 1996 has been given National Heritage status. On 30 September 2016, Mercator was removed from her usual mooring and dry-docked for an extensive overhaul elsewhere in Ostend harbour. She returned on 29 March 2017 to her usual berth and role as a museum ship.

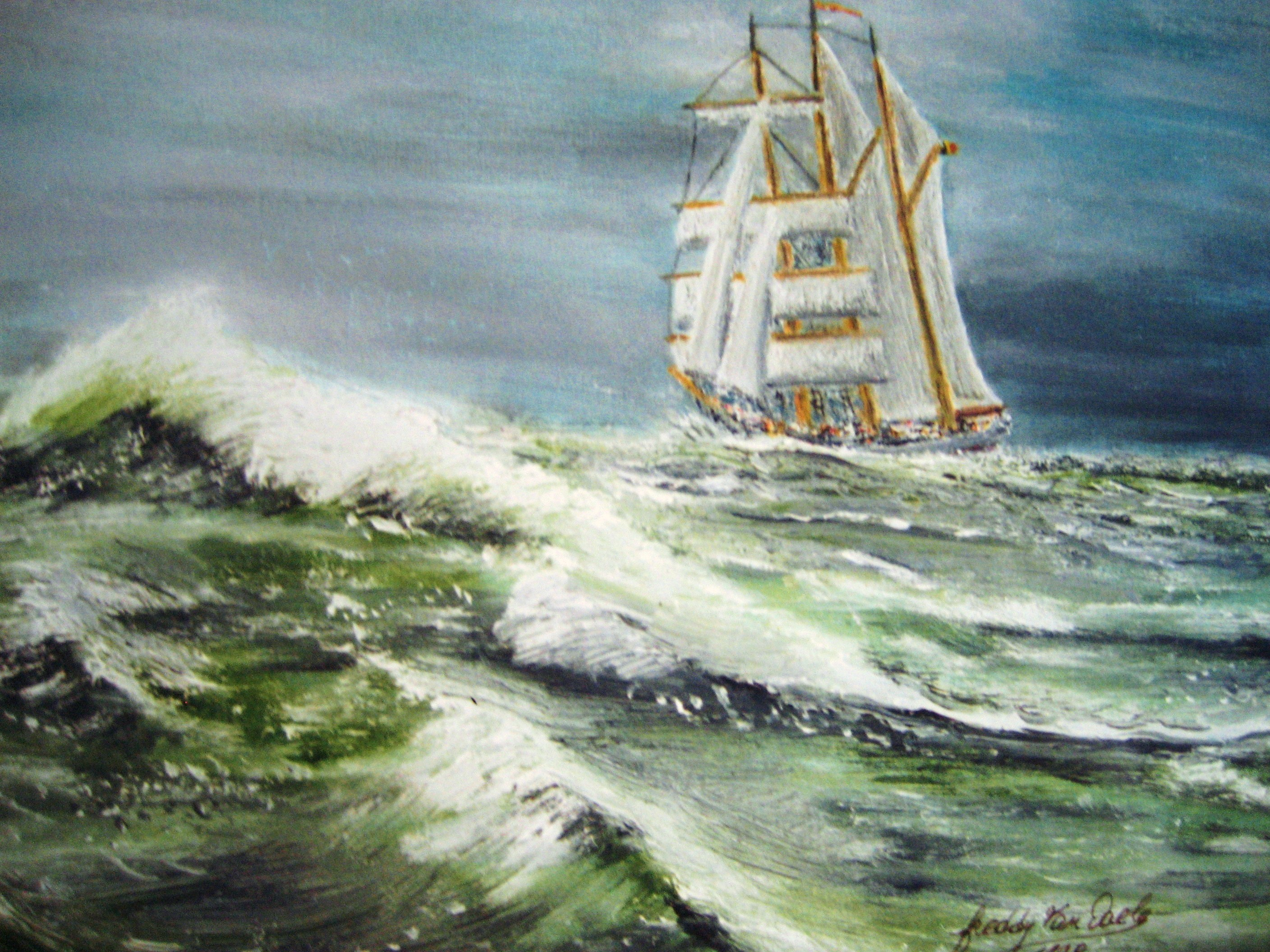
Mercator in the North Sea, painting by Freddy Van Daele (Hosdent-Latinne, Belgium)

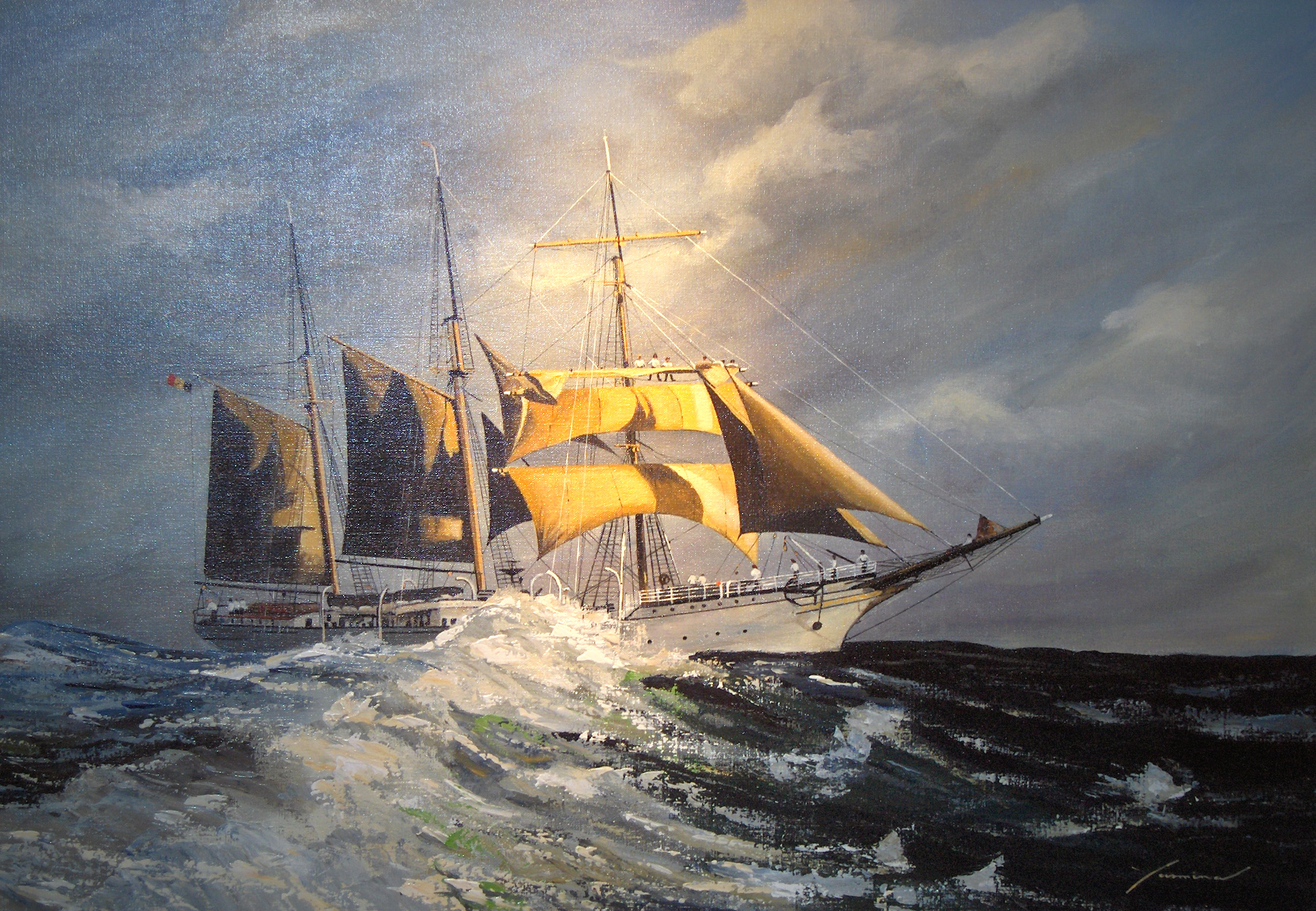
Mercator at sea, painting by Yasmina Van Hove, a.k.a. Yasmina (Ostend, Belgium)

== Books ==
- Gust Vandegoor: Commandant en schoolschip: Remi Van de Sande en de Mercator, 2009
- Werner Van de Walle: Mercator en de Belgische schoolschepen, 2012
- Freddy Van Daele: 1956 The Belgian Training-Vessel MERCATOR and the first international Tall-ships'race, 2018
