= Château de Fallais =

Castle in Liège Province, Belgium

- Fallais, Liège Province, Wallonia, Belgium
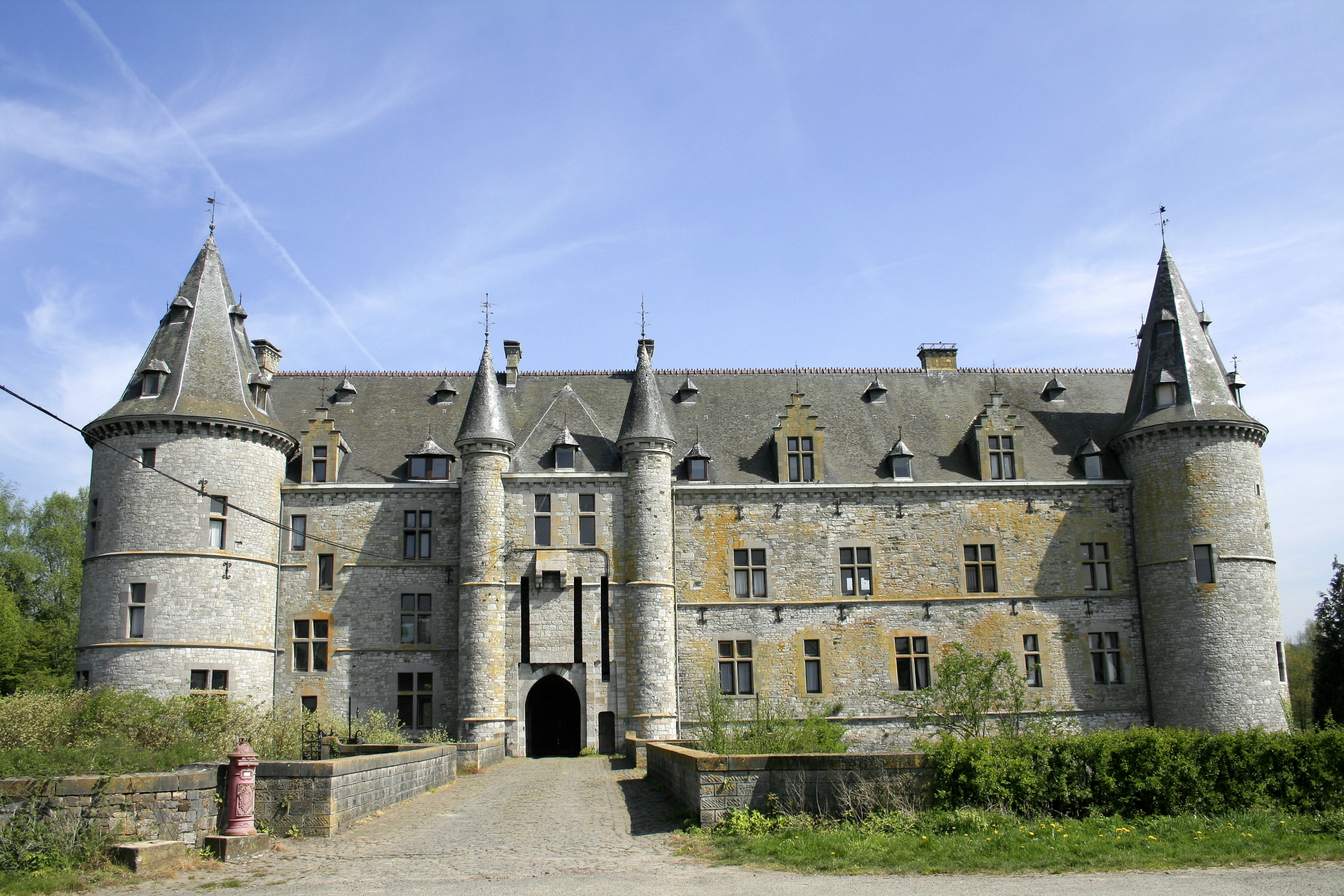

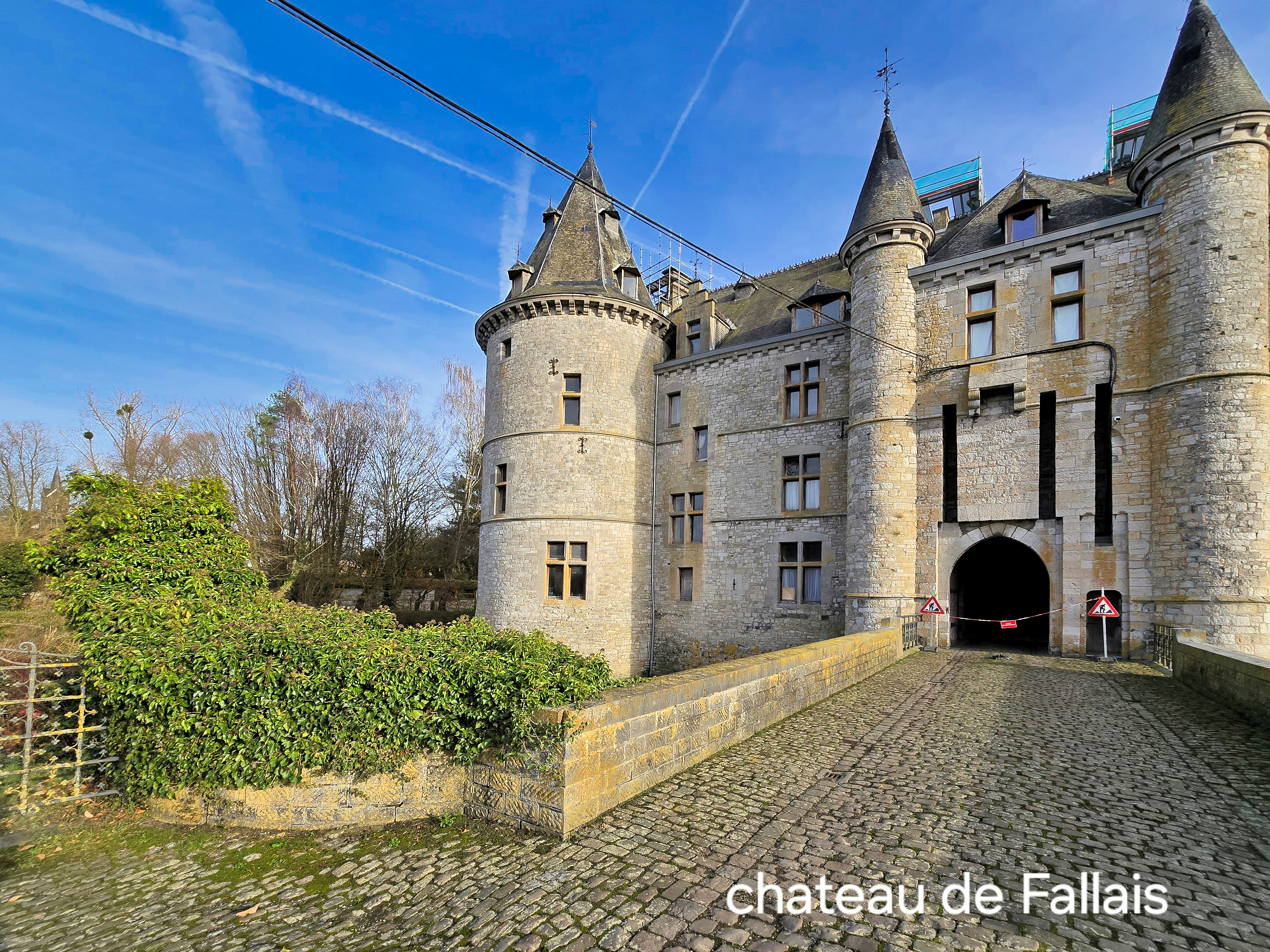

Site information
- Type: Castle

Location
- Coordinates: 50.608°N 5.171°E

Château de Fallais (French pronunciation: [ʃato də falɛ], "Fallais Castle") is a castle originating in the 11th century in the ancienne commune of Fallais, municipality of Braives, Liège Province, Wallonia, Belgium.

The castle was built in the 13th Century by the Beaufort family. Twice the lords were involved in armed conflicts with the Prince-Bishopric of Liège. The first conflict was the so-called war of cows in the period of 1275–1278, fought between Guy I, Count of Namur, and John of Enghien, Prince-Bishop of Liege.

In 1458 Philip the Good, Duke of Burgundy, made his 18-year-old nephew, Louis de Bourbon, the Prince-Bishop of Liege. When Louis finished his studies and took on his duties in 1465, the First Liège War broke out when Louis was deposed by the citizens of the city of Liège. In October 1465, Louis met with his cousin, Charles the Bold (future Duke of Burgundy) at Château de Fallais. Charles then led the Burgundians to the Battle of Montenaken, where they routed the Liégeoise, suppressing the rebellion and ensuring the loss of autonomy of Liège until 1477.

== See also ==
- List of castles in Belgium
