= List of protected heritage sites in Braives =

This table shows an overview of the protected heritage sites in the Walloon town Braives. This list is part of Belgium's national heritage.

| Object | Year/architect | Town/section | Address | Coordinates | Number^{?} | Image |
|---|---|---|---|---|---|---|
| Terrain next to Roman road with votive stone and old elm tree ^{(nl)} ^{(fr)} | | Braives | | 50.636135°N 5.144857°E | 64015-CLT-0001-01 Info | Ensemble van land naast de Romeinse weg, met stenen votief en drie oude iepen |
| Tumulus of Avennes ^{(nl)} ^{(fr)} | | Braives | Braives | 50.634531°N 5.128128°E | 64015-CLT-0003-01 Info | Tumulus van Avennes en diens omgeving |
| Old smithy next to Pitet farmhouse ^{(nl)} ^{(fr)} | | Braives | Fallais | 50.600317°N 5.183908°E | 64015-CLT-0004-01 Info | |
| Pitet garden house ^{(nl)} ^{(fr)} | | Braives | Fallais | 50.601966°N 5.181664°E | 64015-CLT-0005-01 Info | |
| house ^{(nl)} ^{(fr)} | | Braives | Pitet | 50.603174°N 5.186549°E | 64015-CLT-0006-01 Info | Site van Mont-Saint-Sauveur |
| Choir of the church of St. Martin ^{(nl)} ^{(fr)} | | Braives | Avenne-lez-Hannut | 50.628954°N 5.115389°E | 64015-CLT-0007-01 Info | |
| house ^{(nl)} ^{(fr)} | | Braives | rue de la vieille Cense, n° 5 | 50.587461°N 5.187238°E | 64015-CLT-0008-01 Info | Het hoofdgebouw van de boerderij van het kasteel van Fumal |
| Organ of the church of St. Martin ^{(nl)} ^{(fr)} | | Braives | | 50.586947°N 5.184754°E | 64015-CLT-0009-01 Info | |
| Church and Castle of St. Martin ^{(nl)} ^{(fr)} | | Braives | | 50.588029°N 5.182902°E | 64015-CLT-0010-01 Info | Kerk Saint-Martin en kasteel |
| Choir and columns of the church of St. Désiré ^{(nl)} ^{(fr)} | | Braives | Latinne | 50.622917°N 5.157165°E | 64015-CLT-0011-01 Info | Het koor en de kolommen van het schip van de kerk Saint-Désiré |
| Tumulus Tombe of Yve ^{(nl)} ^{(fr)} | | Braives | | 50.605917°N 5.141911°E | 64015-CLT-0012-01 Info | Tombe van Yve, een tumulus en zijn omgeving |
| Church of the Annunciation ^{(nl)} ^{(fr)} | | Braives | | 50.616700°N 5.114870°E | 64015-CLT-0013-01 Info | |
| Chapel ruins of Mont-Saint-Sauveur ^{(nl)} ^{(fr)} | | Braives | Braives | 50.603175°N 5.188223°E | 64015-CLT-0014-01 Info | |
| "le Stwerdu" mill ^{(nl)} ^{(fr)} | | Braives | Fallais | 50.608775°N 5.172753°E | 64015-CLT-0015-01 Info | Gevels en daken van de molen "le Stwerdu", en de twee molenstenen, het ensemble van de molen en diens omgeving |
| Former court house ^{(nl)} ^{(fr)} | | Braives | place de la Cour de justice n°2 | 50.616010°N 5.162330°E | 64015-CLT-0016-01 Info | Voormalige Hof van Justitie (gevel en daken) |
| "tour Grignard" tower ^{(nl)} ^{(fr)} | | Braives | | 50.608154°N 5.170854°E | 64015-CLT-0017-01 Info | Gevels en daken van het poortgebouw, het ensemble van de duiventoren "tour Grignard", constructie van 1757 en de brug die de hoofdtoegang vormt bestaat uit twee delen verspreid over twee rijen, van het kasteel van Fallais, en het ensemble van het kasteel en diens omgeving |
| Organs of the church of Notre-Dame ^{(nl)} ^{(fr)} | | Braives | | 50.610035°N 5.171123°E | 64015-CLT-0019-01 Info | |
| Tumulus of Avennes ^{(nl)} ^{(fr)} | | Braives | | 50.634531°N 5.128128°E | 64015-PEX-0001-01 Info | Tumulus van Avennes |
| Archeological site of the Tombe of Yve ^{(nl)} ^{(fr)} | | Braives | | 50.605917°N 5.141911°E | 64015-PEX-0002-01 Info | Tombe van Yve, de archeologische site van de grafheuvel en de omgeving |

== See also ==
- List of protected heritage sites in Liège (province)
- Braives
