= Fallais =

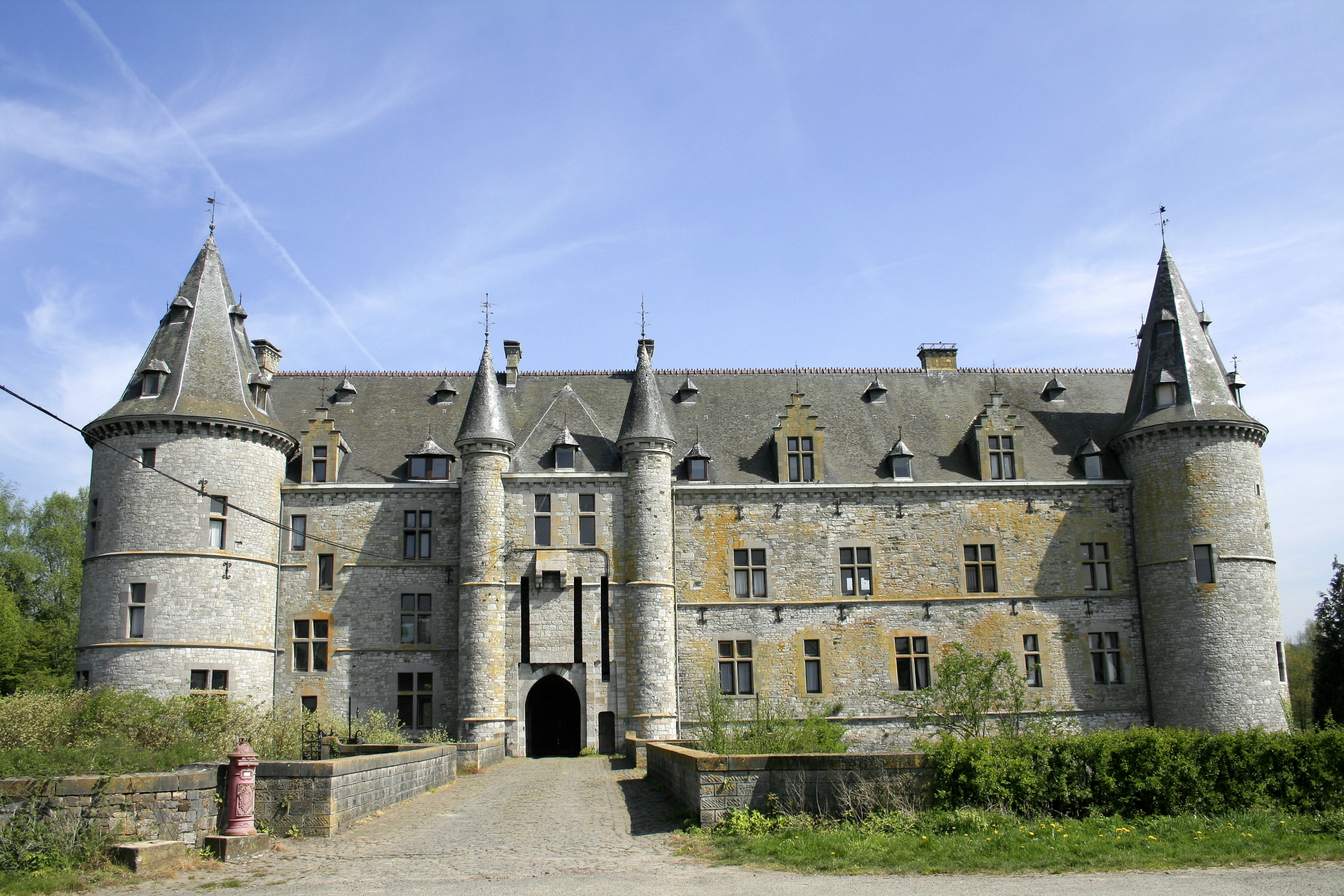
- Château de Fallais in Fallais

- Location within Belgium Location within Europe
- Coordinates: 50°36′39″N 05°10′15″E
- Country: Belgium
- Region: Wallonia
- Province: Liège
- Municipality: Braives

Fallais (French pronunciation: [falɛ]) is a village and district of the municipality of Braives, located in the province of Liège in Wallonia, Belgium.

The village developed around the castle, Château de Fallais, which dates back to the 11th century. Apart from the castle, which in its current form dates largely from the 14th century, the village also contains a historical watermill, a chapel constructed in 1819 and the village church, dating from 1854 but containing several historical furnishings.
