= Peacemaker (ship) =

American barquentine

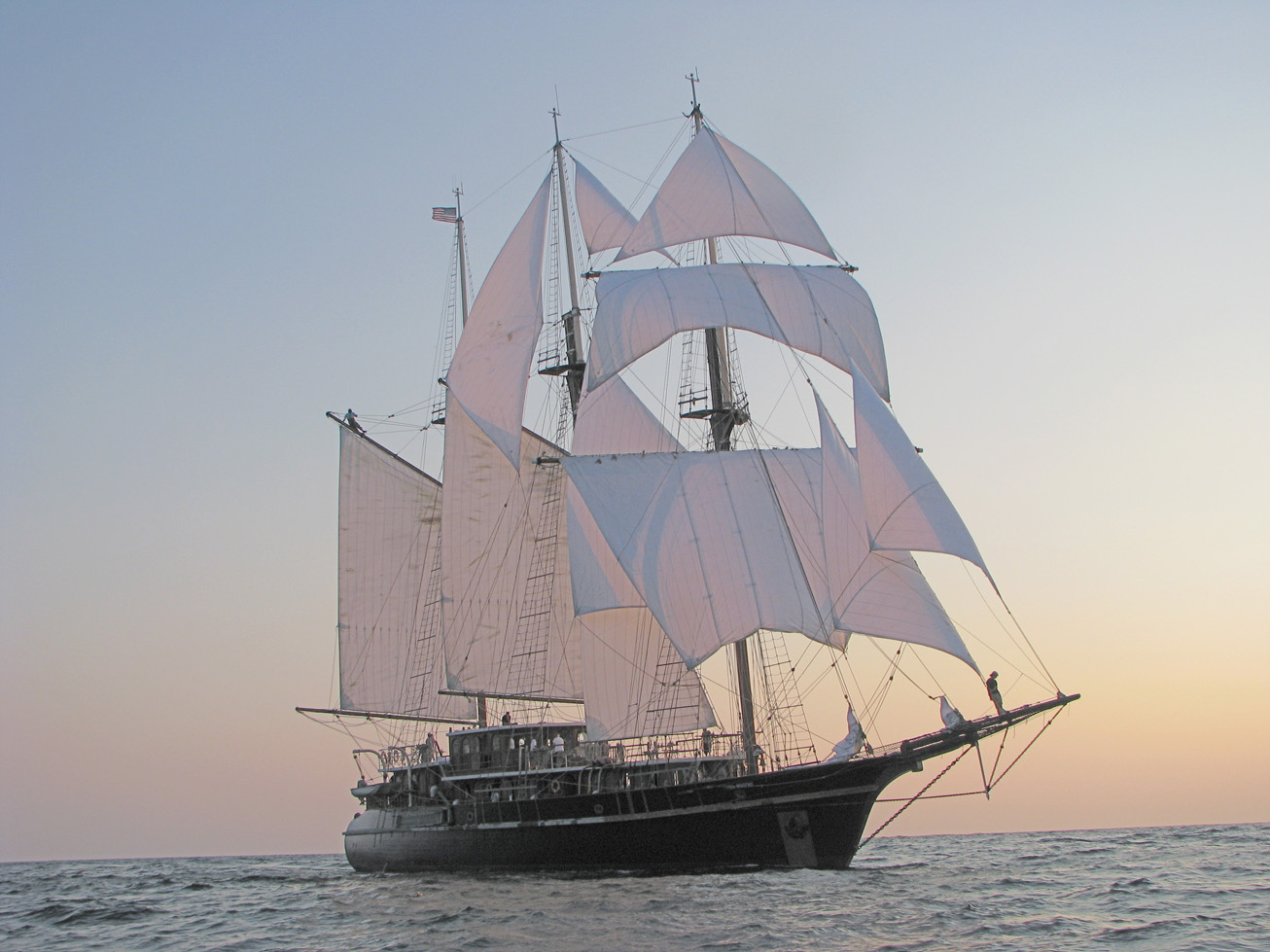
- Peacemaker Marine 1 under full sail

History

United States
- Name: Peacemaker
- Owner: The Twelve Tribes
- Operator: The Twelve Tribes
- Builder: Frank Walker (hull), Wayne Chimenti (rig)
- Laid down: 1986
- Launched: 1989
- Renamed: 2007
- Home port: Brunswick, Georgia
- Identification: MMSI number: 367563230; Callsign: WDG7035

General characteristics
- Type: Barquentine
- Displacement: 400 T
- Length: 108 ft (33 m) at waterline, 124 ft (38 m) on deck, 150 feet (46 m) sparred length
- Beam: 34 ft (10 m)
- Height: 126 ft (38 m)
- Draft: 14 ft (4.3 m)
- Propulsion: Sail; two 400HP diesel engines
- Notes: 10,000 square feet (930 m^{2}) sail area. Ipê wood hull, aluminum masts, laminated Douglas fir spars

Peacemaker is an American barquentine owned by the Twelve Tribes religious group.

== History ==
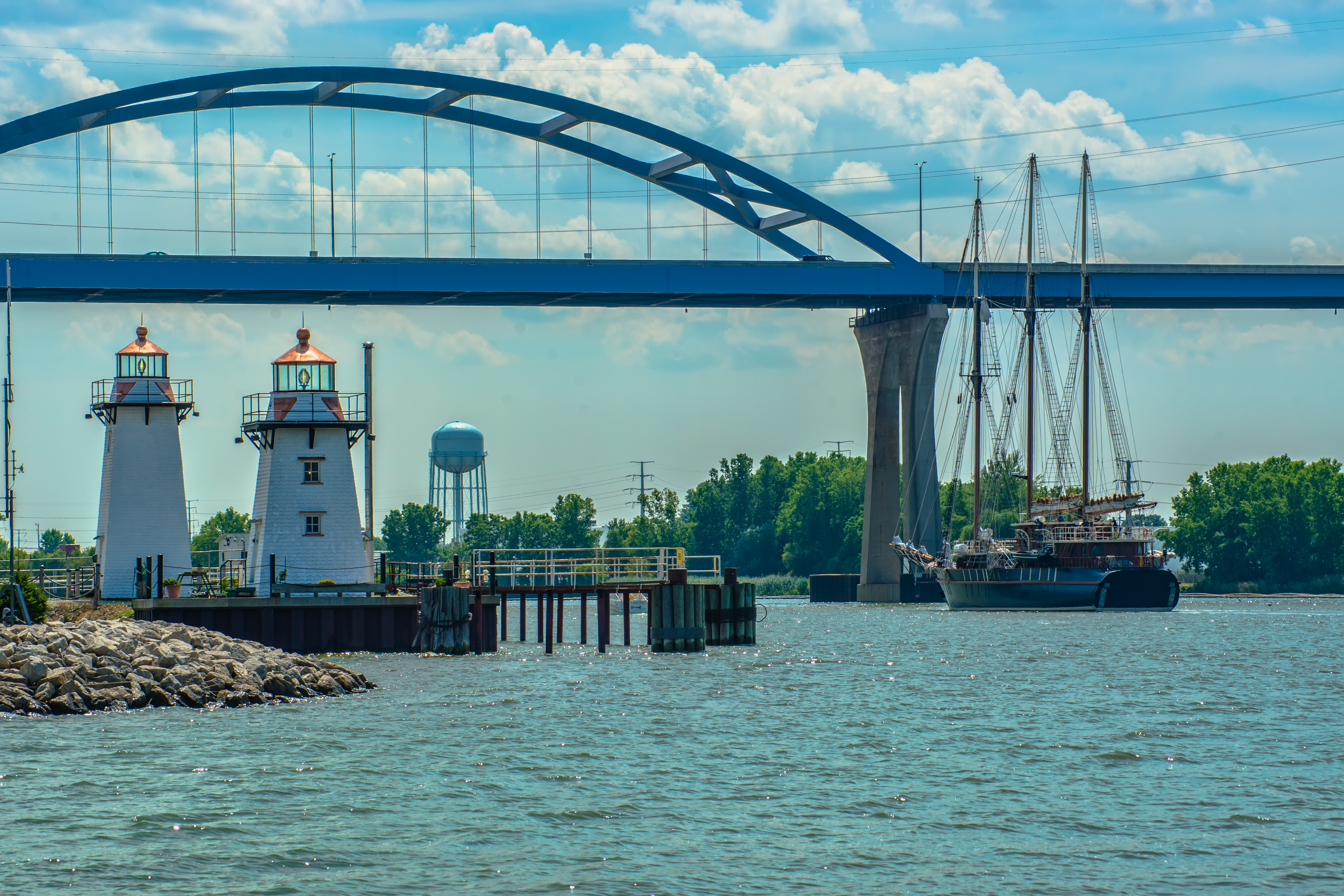
Peacemaker motors toward the Leo Frigo Memorial Bridge on its journey into the Port of Green Bay and past the Grassy Island Range Lights.

Peacemaker, originally named Avany, was built on a riverbank in southern Brazil using traditional methods and tropical hardwoods, and was launched in 1989. The original owner and his family motored in the southern Atlantic Ocean before bringing the ship up through the Caribbean to Savannah, Georgia, where they intended to rig it as a three-masted staysail Marconi rigged motorsailer. The work was never done, however, and in the summer of 2000, it was purchased by the Twelve Tribes, a religious group with 50 or so communities in North and South America, Europe, and Australia. They spent the next seven years replacing all of the ship’s mechanical and electrical systems and rigging it as a barquentine. The refit vessel set sail for the first time in the spring of 2007, under the name Peacemaker.

== Purpose ==
Peacemaker is used to travel between the communities of the Twelve Tribes while providing an apprenticeship program for their youth in sailing, seamanship, navigation, and boat maintenance. In 2013, some victims of the Twelve Tribes’ practices came forward and alleged to the FBI that the ship is used to transport drugs for use in ritual ceremonies. No trial was ever held on these allegations, and the case was closed with no action.

The ship has a United States Coast Guard attraction vessel permit and is available for festivals and dockside hospitality events.

== Features ==
Peacemaker has a large deckhouse and spacious cabins finished in mahogany, modeled after the interior of Cutty Sark. It also has an innovative transom that can be lowered while in port to reveal a watertight bulkhead with two large doors opening into a cargo area and fully equipped workshop.

== Present day ==
In 2013, Peacemaker participated in the Tall Ships 1812 Tour, a pan-provincial event that traveled throughout Ontario during the summer of 2013, commemorating the bicentennial of the War of 1812. Sixteen ports participated in this event which partnered with the Tall Ships Challenge Great Lakes 2013 series. The first port of call for the tour was Brockville, Ontario, June 14–16, 2013.

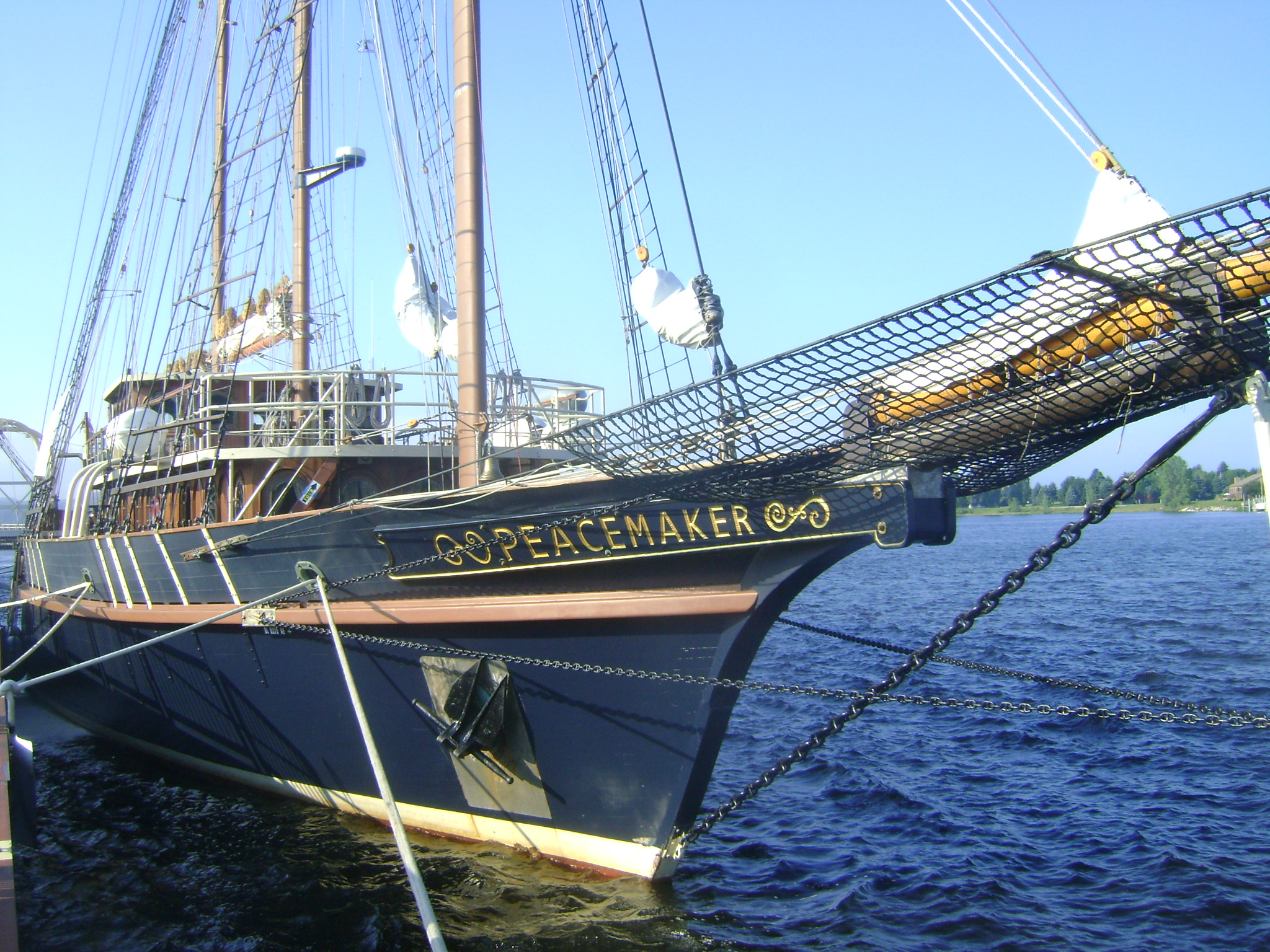

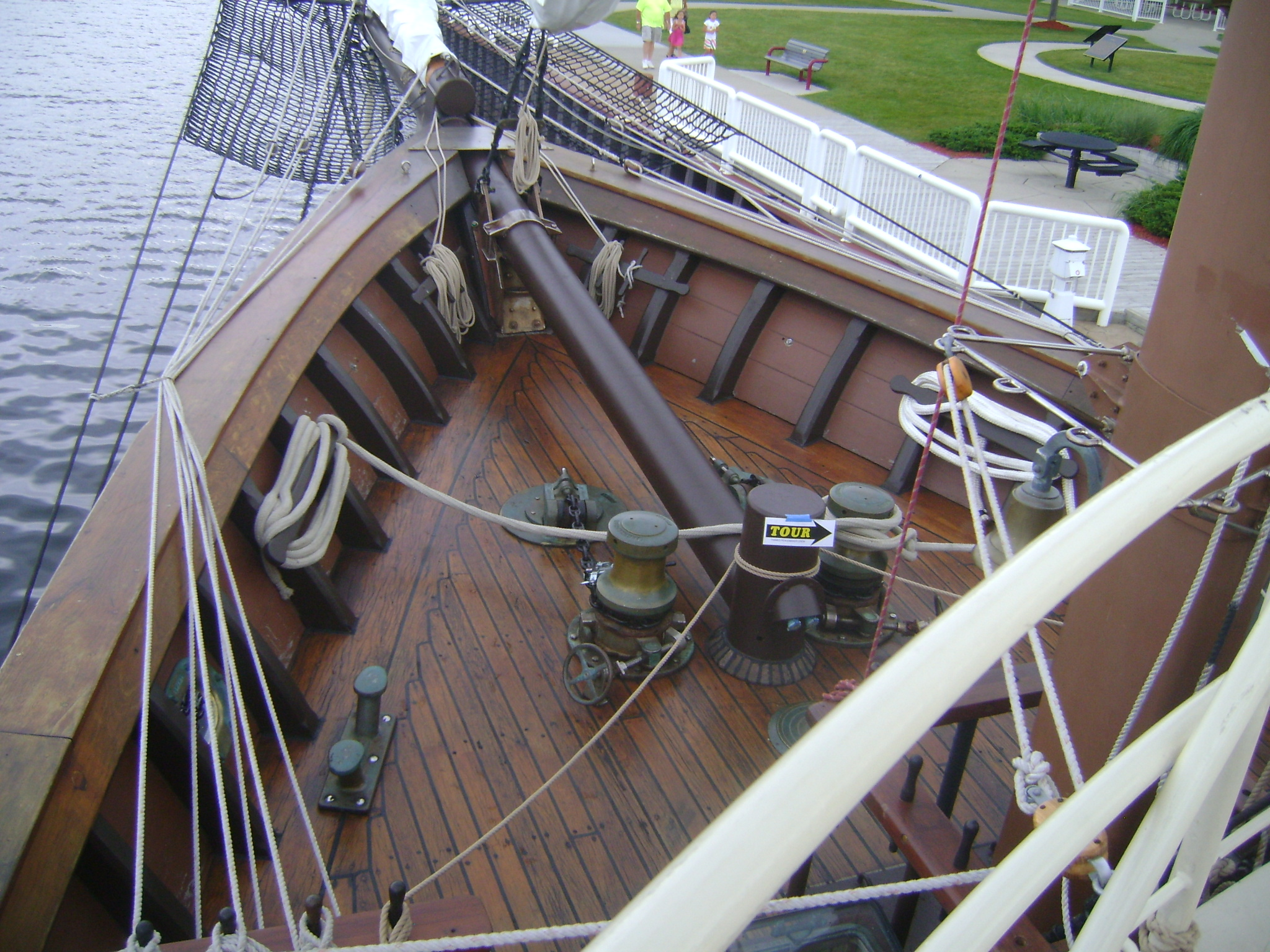

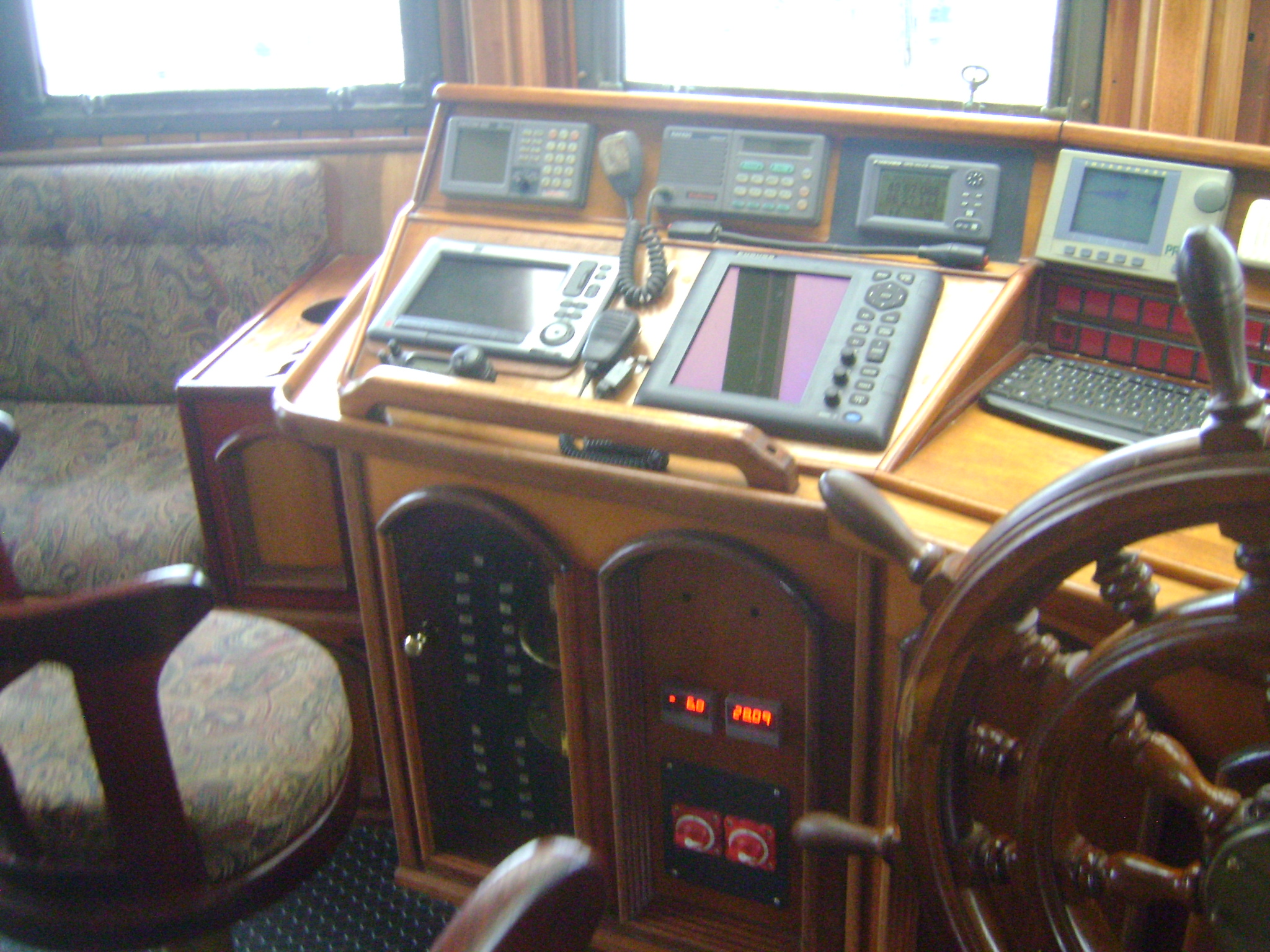

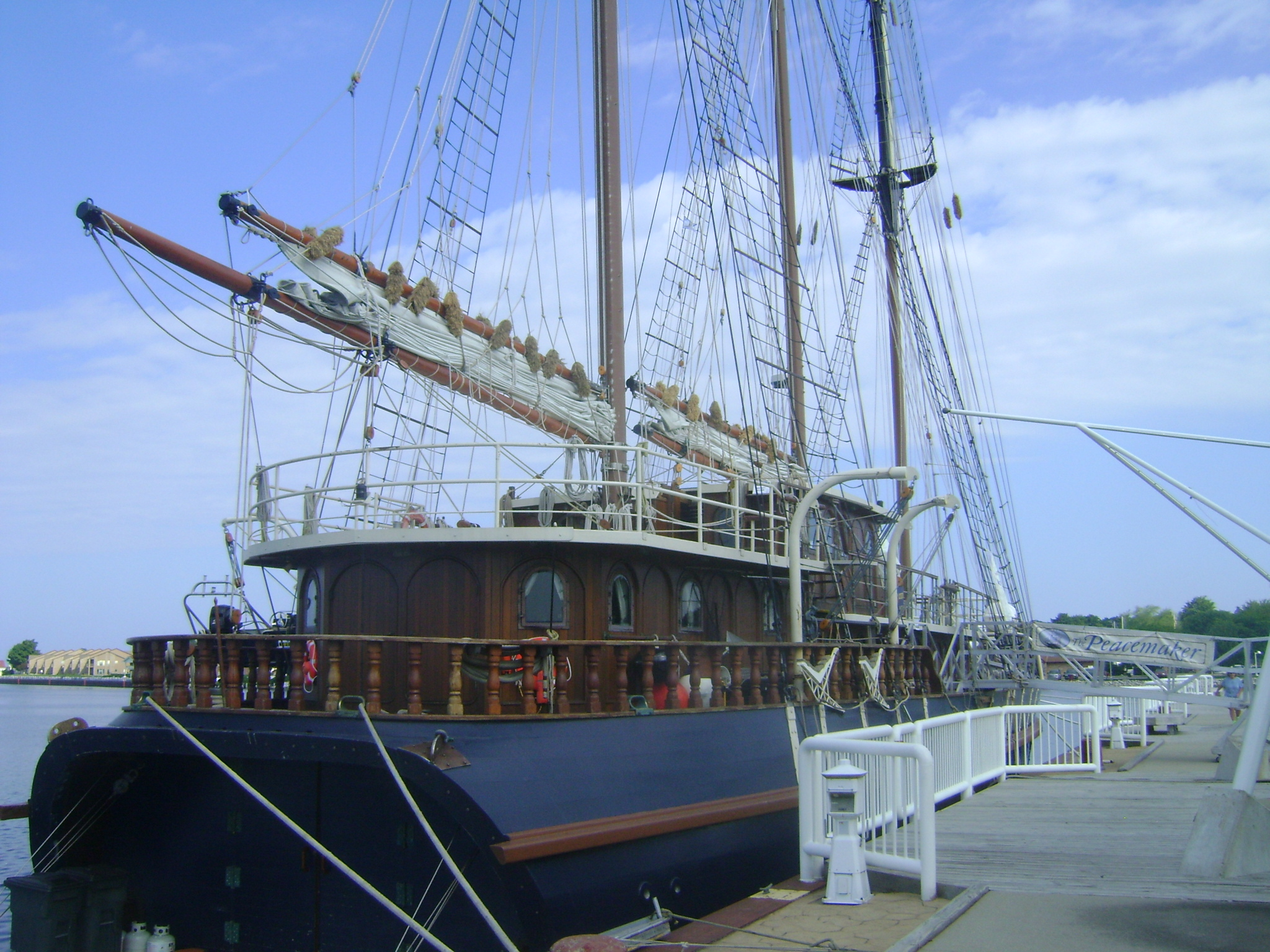

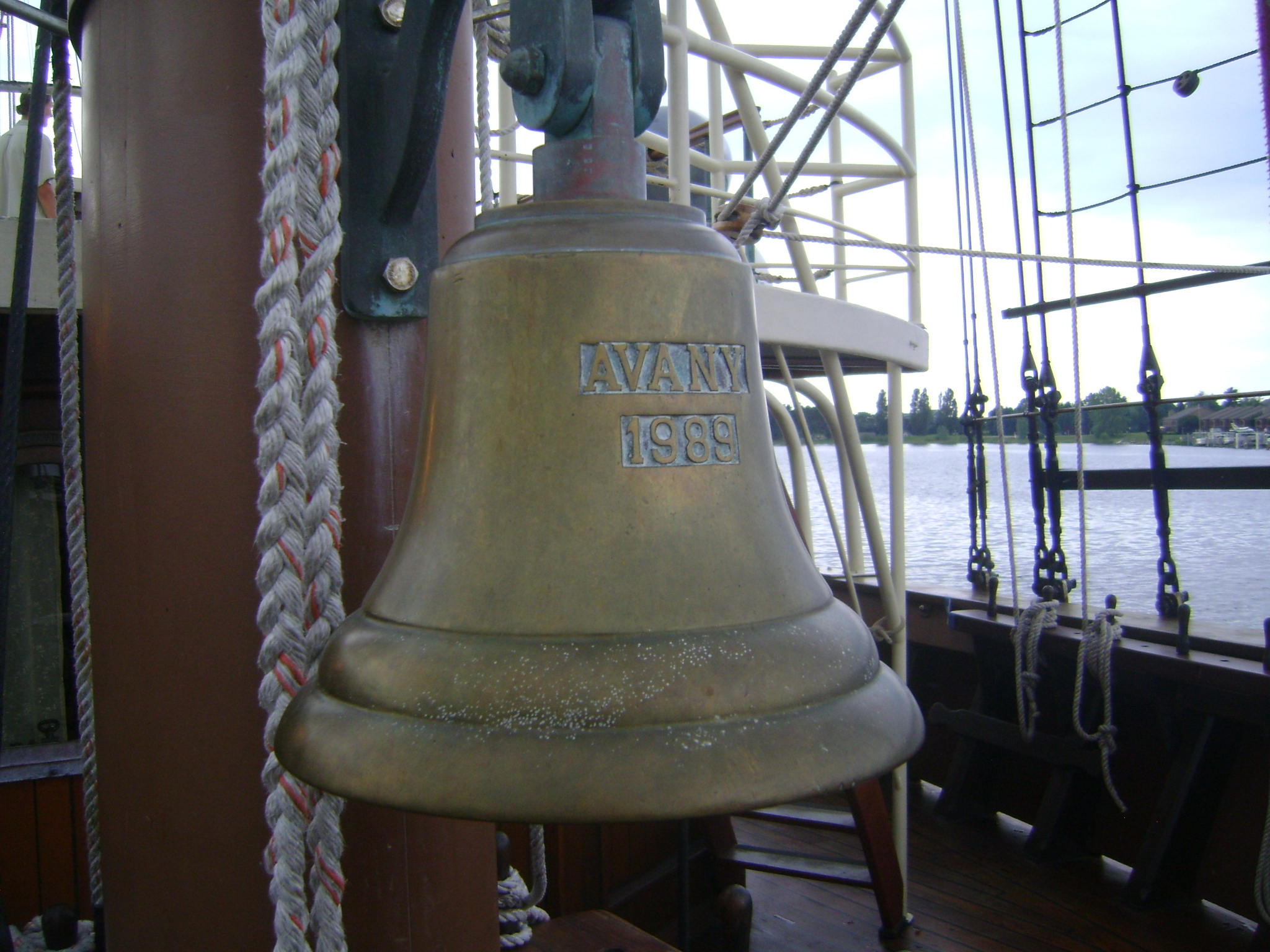

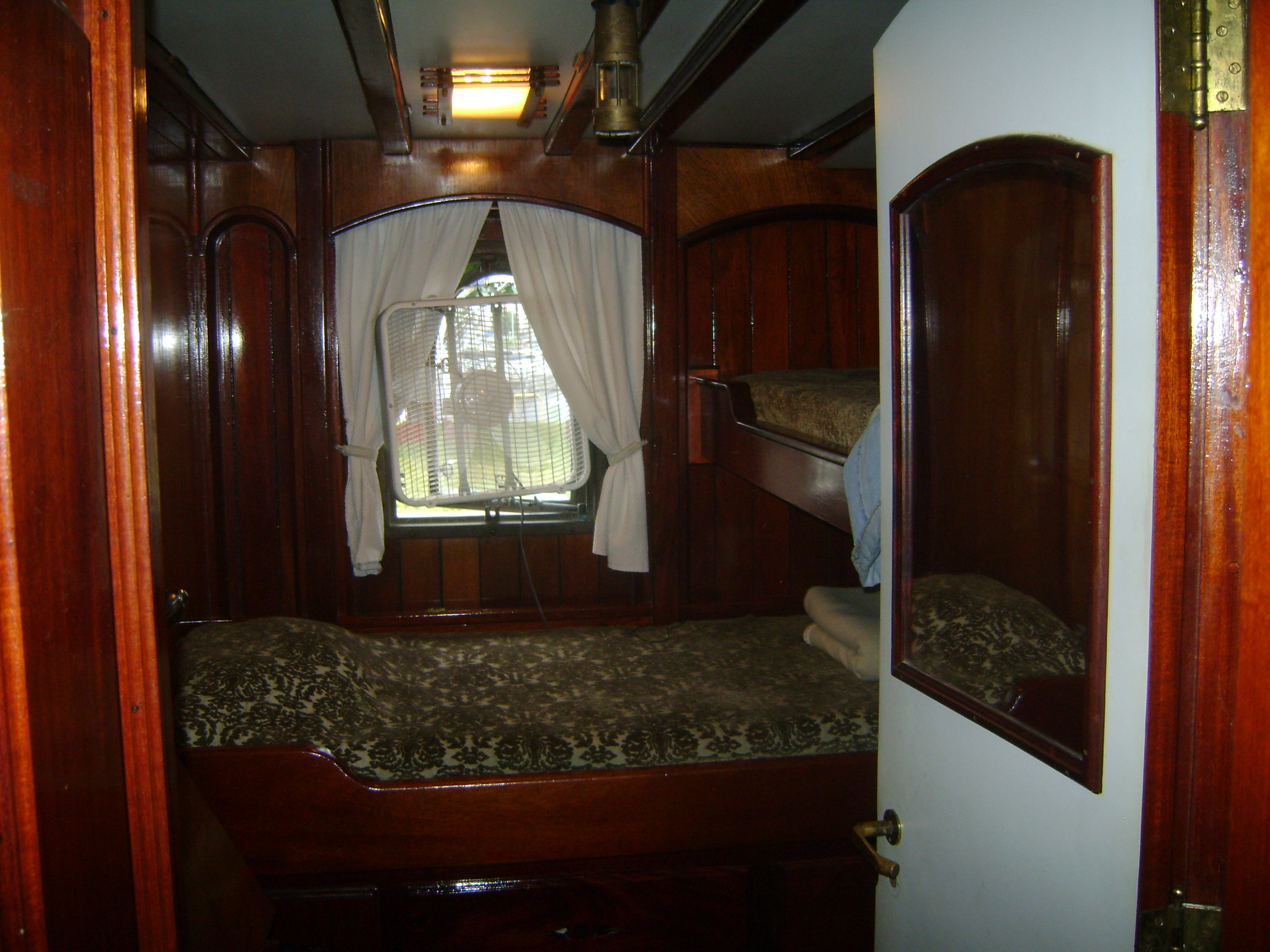

In 2015, Peacemaker was listed for sale and gained notoriety when it was published that the Vollmer twins had hopes of purchasing it for use as what can best be described as a voyage to their deaths, with 'tribesmembers (including Zerubabel) coming along to teach final use of the vessel. The deal reportedly did not go forward when a Venezuelan bond package failed, resulting in lack of funds.

The Twelve Tribes brought the Peacemaker for a visit to Rhode Island in July, 2021.

The Peacemaker boat went on sale in 2015 for $3.5 million and is being offered for $2 million as of July 2026.
