= Avennes =

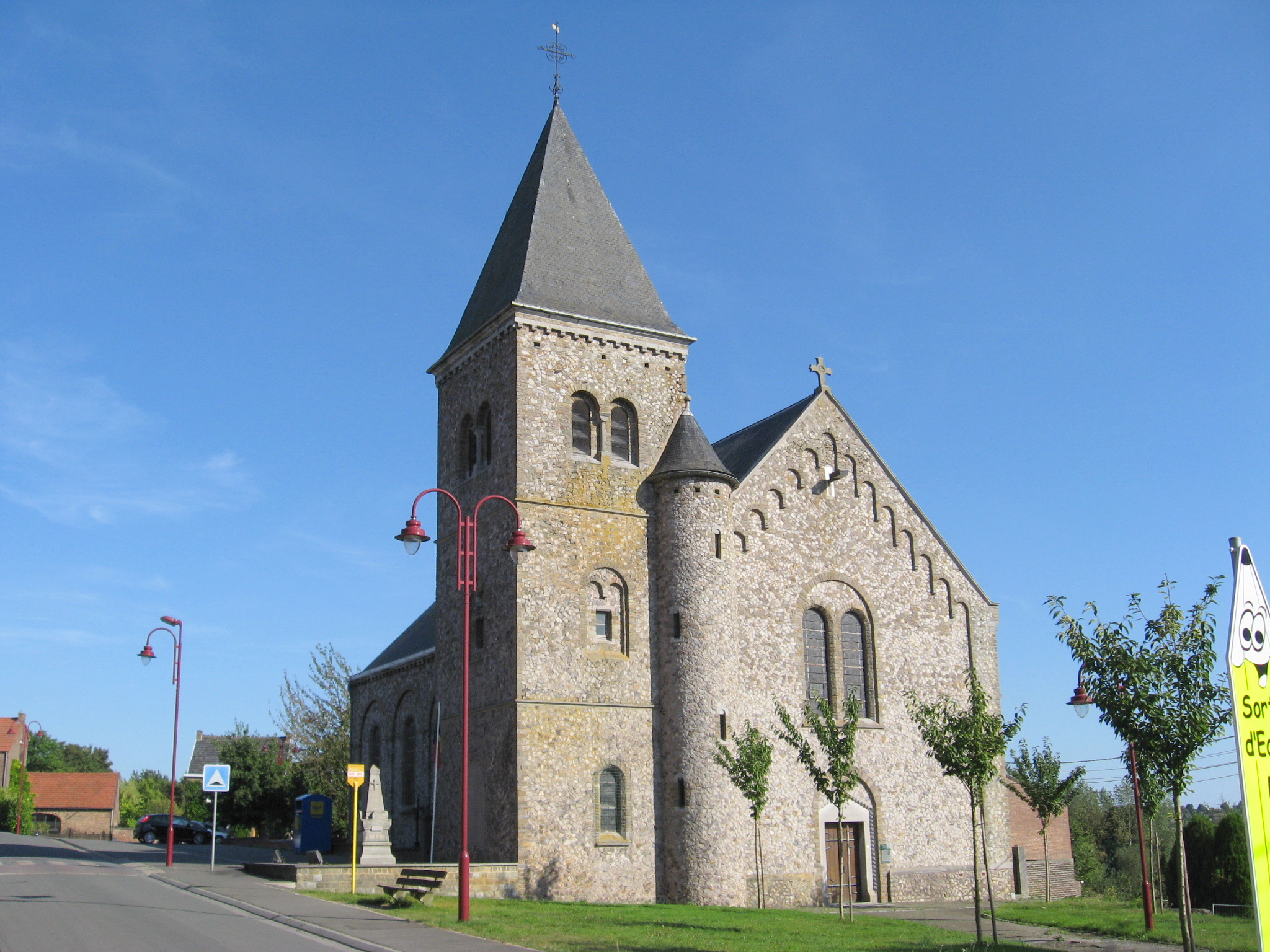
- Avennes, village church

- Location within Belgium Location within Europe
- Coordinates: 50°37′45″N 05°06′52″E
- Country: Belgium
- Region: Wallonia
- Province: Liège
- Municipality: Braives

Avennes (French pronunciation: [avɛn]) is a village and district of the municipality of Braives, located in the province of Liège in Wallonia, Belgium.

Avennes was settled by the Franks during the 5th century. The village church is in a Romanesque Revival style, built in 1905 and replaced an earlier, 12th-century church building. It contains historical furnishings including a large medieval crucifix and a baptismal font from the 17th century. The village also contains a watermill which traces its origins to 1347.
