= Fumal =

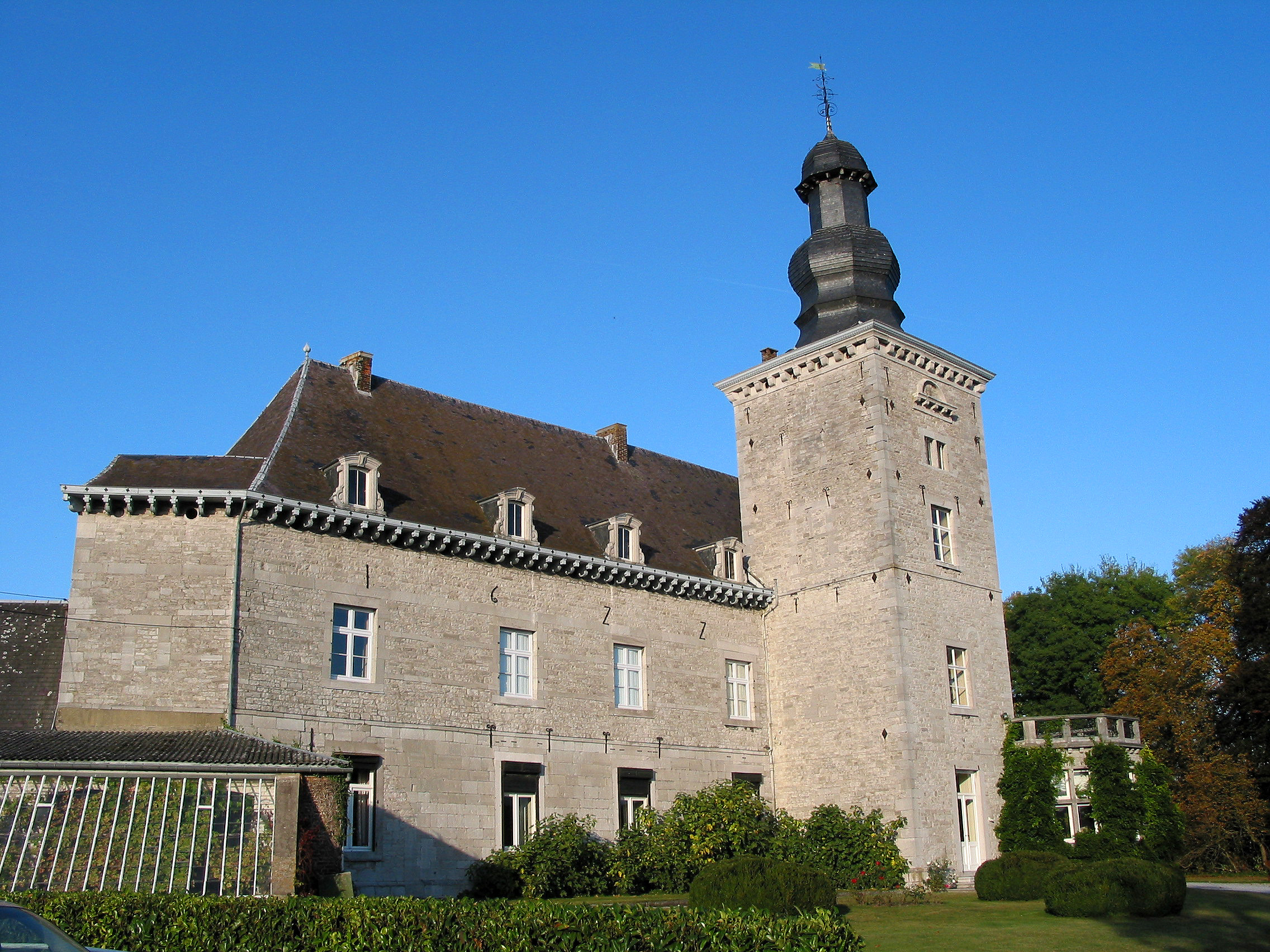
- Fumal, the castle

- Location within Belgium Location within Europe
- Coordinates: 50°35′11″N 05°10′58″E
- Country: Belgium
- Region: Wallonia
- Province: Liège
- Municipality: Braives

Fumal (French pronunciation: [fymal]) is a village and district of the municipality of Braives, located in the province of Liège in Wallonia, Belgium.

The village developed around the castle, which was the centre of a fief since the 12th century. During much of its history, the village was divided with some parts belonging to the County of Namur and some to the Prince-Bishopric of Liège. The castle of Fumal has been rebuilt and altered continuously since the 16th century. Its oldest part is the square tower. Other historical buildings in the village includes the church, dedicated to Saint Martin and the former castle farm, dating from the 16th century.
