= København (ship) =

Danish 1913 barque

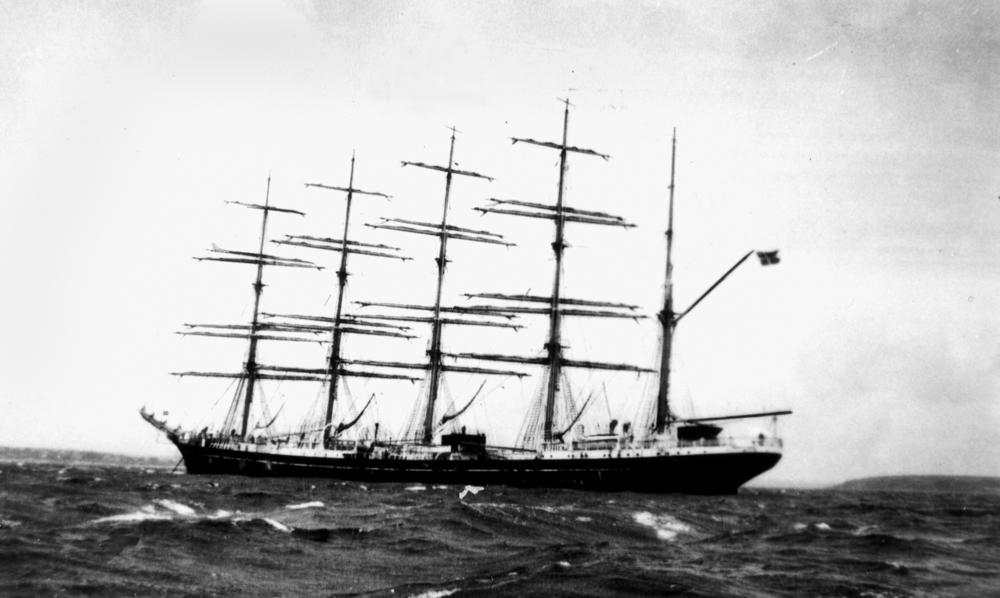
- København

History

Denmark
- Name: København
- Namesake: Copenhagen
- Owner: East Asiatic Company
- Builder: Ramage & Ferguson, Leith
- Yard number: 242
- Laid down: 1913
- Completed: 24 March 1921
- Fate: Disappeared after 22 December 1928

General characteristics
- Class & type: sail training
- Type: Five-masted barque
- Tonnage: 3,965 GRT
- Length: 131.9 m (432.74 ft) o/a
- Beam: 14.9 m (48.88 ft)
- Height: 48.6 m (159.45 ft)
- Depth: 8.7 m (28.54 ft)
- Propulsion: Auxiliary diesel engine
- Sail plan: Barque; 4,644.4 m^{2} (49,992 sq ft) sail area
- Crew: 26 crew and 45 cadets

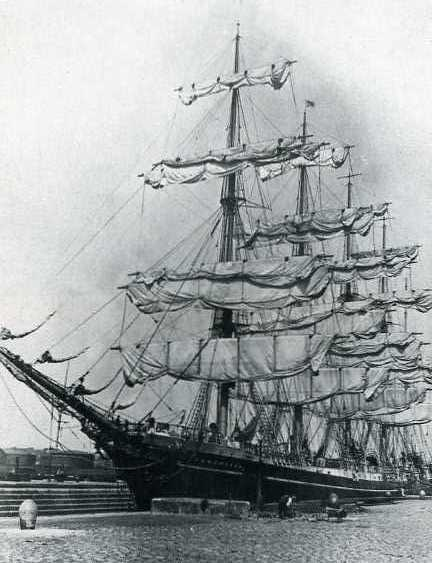
København at dock

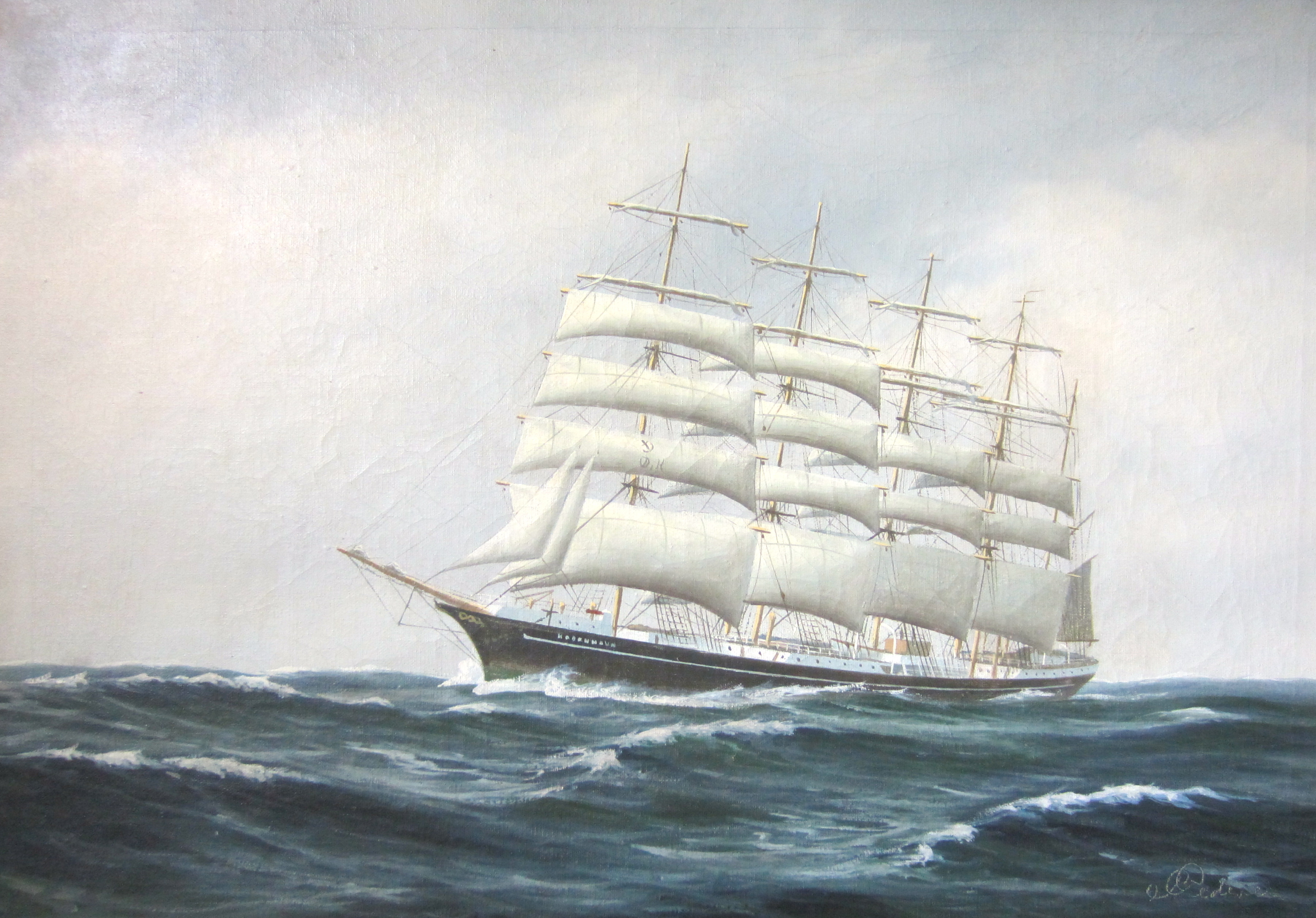
Five-masted barque "København" with ØK in her sail. Oil-painting by Peder Chr. Pedersen.

København (Copenhagen) was a Danish owned, British-built five-masted barque used as a naval training vessel until its disappearance after 22 December 1928. Built for the Danish East Asiatic Company in 1921, it was the world's largest sailing ship at the time, and primarily served for sail training of young cadets.

The København was last heard from on 21 December 1928, while en route from Buenos Aires to Australia. When it became clear the ship was missing, a lengthy search ensued, but neither København nor anyone who had been aboard her on her final voyage was ever found. Despite both the extensive search and much speculation about the vessel's fate, København remains missing and what happened to her crew and cadets remains a mystery.

== Description ==
The København was built by the firm of Ramage & Ferguson at Leith in Scotland (hull number 256). It was commissioned by the Danish East Asiatic Company as a sail training ship. Their original commission of January 1914 was well underway at the onset of the First World War when the British Admiralty commandeered the first commission as an oil fuel tender. The East Asiatic Company had to then recommission their training ship and this second commission began in 1918 and was completed in 1921. The second commission included for a four-cylinder diesel engine by Burmeister & Wain capable of propelling the ship at 6 knots. The propellers were fitted with reversible blades (controlled from within) to ease the reversing of the ship. She was classified by Lloyd's of London as Class 100 A1, the highest classification of the age.

Known as the "Big Dane", it was the largest sailing ship in the world when completed. It was 430 feet (131 metres) long (tip to tail) with a 390 foot long deck and grossed 3,965 tons empty, with a capacity of 5200 tons. A central water ballast of up to 1245 tons provided excellent stability. Its five masts stood 197 feet (60m) over the keel, with sails spanning a total of 56,000 square feet (5,202 square metres). It had an auxiliary diesel motor as well as a wireless transmitter. The figurehead was a carving of a helmeted Bishop Absalon, the warrior-priest who founded the city of Copenhagen. The heavy standing rigging ran to 4.5 miles in length and weighed 27 tons, the lighter running rigging stretched to a further 23 miles and weighed a further 23 tons. Her 204 tons of fuel oil could propel the ship for 75 days without wind.

Two Bolinder engines served the ballast pump and provided electric lighting.

Primarily intended for training young cadets seeking an officer's license, the ship offset some of its costs by carrying limited amounts of cargo on its voyages. Baron Niels Juel-Brockdorff oversaw the ship's construction and subsequently served as its first captain on its trip from Leith to Copenhagen. In Copenhagen the magnificent ship had 12000 visitors including the King and Queen of Denmark.

The crew included a schoolmaster and doctor, several officers and 28 able seamen originally with 18 trainee cadets. This was later increased to 60 cadets. Cadets were exclusively Danish.

== Trips ==
From 1921 to 1928 the ship made nine commercial voyages, visiting nearly every continent and completing two circumnavigations. These included:

- Maiden Voyage – World circumnavigation – 30 September 1921 – 7 November 1922. 38326 sea miles (information taken from the private log of her Captain on that voyage Baron Niels Juel-Brockdorff)
- 1925 – London to Bangkok via the Suez Canal – 64 days
- October 1925 – left Gdańsk with a cargo of timber bound for Australia – fire on board necessitated repair at Plymouth the Plymouth to Melbourne leg took 81 days
- 1926 – Banyuwangi to Copenhagen – 86 days
- 1926 – Copenhagen to Adelaide – 78 days
- 1927 – Adelaide to Falmouth – 109 days
- 1927 – Liverpool to Chile via the Panama Canal

However, on this last trip, under Cpt. Christiansen, 300 miles south of Callao on the west coast of South America she lost a propeller blade and had to go to Callao for repair.

- October 1927 – Caleta Coloso in Chile to Gdańsk – 81 days

== Disappearance ==
On 21 September 1928 the København departed from Nørresundby in Vendsyssel for Buenos Aires on its tenth, and ultimately final, voyage. The captain was Hans Andersen; 75 persons were aboard, including 26 crew and 45 cadets. The goal was to unload a shipload of chalk and bagged cement in Buenos Aires, take on another load of cargo and sail for Melbourne, and then bring a shipment of Australian wheat back to Europe.

The København arrived at Buenos Aires on 17 November 1928, impressing the locals, in particular emigrant Danes. The cargo was unloaded; however, the departure was delayed as there were no paying commissions to take the cargo to Australia. Finally, on 14 December, Captain Andersen decided to ship out to Australia without a cargo. The voyage was expected to take 45 days. On 22 December the København exchanged radio messages with the Norwegian steamer William Blumer, indicating they were about 900 miles from Tristan da Cunha and that "all is well". The Blumer attempted to contact the København again later that night, but received no response. The ship was never heard from again.

She was officially announced "missing" by Lloyd's of London on 1 January 1930.

== Search and legacy ==
Search and rescue efforts were not launched immediately after København dropped out of contact, due to the length of the voyage to Australia, and the fact that Andersen routinely went long periods without sending a message. After months without any sight of or word from København, concerns arose that something had gone wrong. In April 1929, four months after København was last seen and heard from, the Danish East Asiatic Company dispatched a motor vessel, the Mexico, to Tristan da Cunha. Residents reported having seen a large five-masted ship with its foremast broken on 21 January 1929; however, it had not attempted to land on the island. The Mexico, joined by the British Royal Navy, searched for the København for several months, but found no sign of it. The Danish government officially declared the ship and its crew were lost at sea.

A number of theories for the København's disappearance have been advanced. The most commonly accepted is that the ship struck an iceberg in the dark or fog. If so, the ship may have sunk too quickly for the crew to react. The lack of wreckage found later may have been the result of the ship's particularly secure loading and rigging, a necessity against the strong winds known as the Roaring Forties. An alternative theory is that the ship, which was in ballast with no cargo, may have been capsized by heavy winds, disabling the lifeboats for survivors.

For the next two years after the København's disappearance there were a number of sightings of a mysterious five-masted ship fitting its description in the Pacific, fueling further speculation about the vessel. Early reports came from Chilean fishermen, then in July 1930, the crew of an Argentine freighter sighted a five-masted "phantom ship" during a gale. The captain took their statements and wondered if this was the "wraith of the Copenhagen". Further sightings came in the following weeks from Easter Island and the Peruvian coast. Later some wreckage, including a piece of stern bearing the name "København", reportedly was found off Western Australia.

Tentative evidence for the ship continued to emerge. In 1934, The New York Times reported that a København cadet's diary had been found in a bottle on Bouvet Island in the South Atlantic. The supposed diary indicated that the ship had been destroyed by icebergs and abandoned, the crew taking their chances in lifeboats. In 1935, human remains and the remains of a lifeboat were found partly buried in the sand along the southwest coast of Africa. These may have come from København.
