= Latinne =

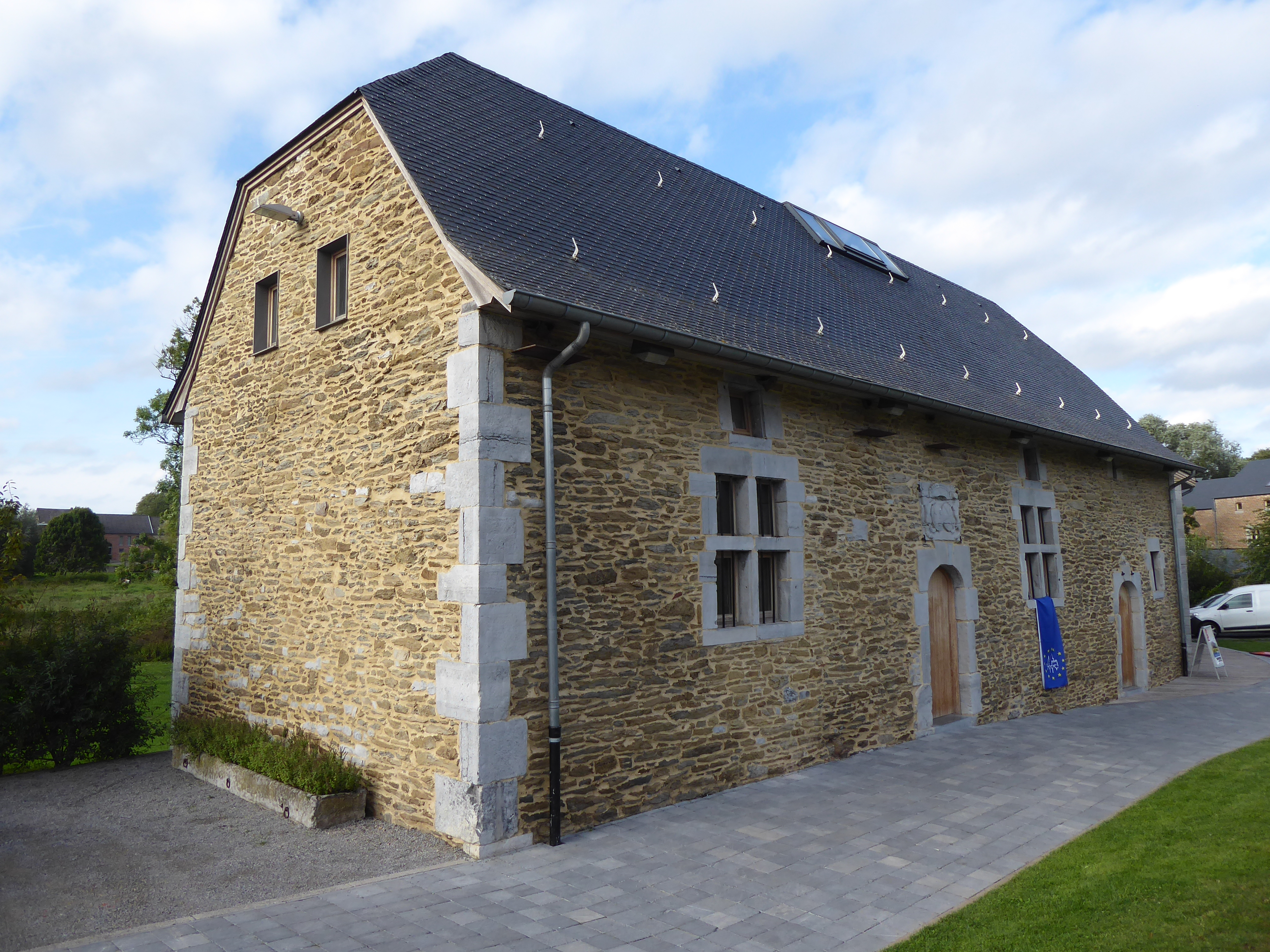
- Historical courthouse in Hosdent, Latinne

- Location within Belgium Location within Europe
- Coordinates: 50°37′27″N 05°09′47″E
- Country: Belgium
- Region: Wallonia
- Province: Liège
- Municipality: Braives

Latinne (French pronunciation: [latin]) is a district of the municipality of Braives, located in the province of Liège in Wallonia, Belgium. The hamlet Hosdent lies within the district.

The area has been settled since at least Neolithic time. During the Middle Ages, the village of Latinne was subservient to the Prince-Bishopric of Liège while Hosdent belonged to the County of Namur. Hosdent contains several historical buildings, including a courthouse built in 1685, a mill, the oldest parts of which are from the 17th century but which was already mentioned in the 15th century, and the village church. The current church, dates largely from the 16th century, when it was rebuilt after having been destroyed during the religious wars of the period. Its facade dates from a renovation done in 1992.
