= Barquentine =

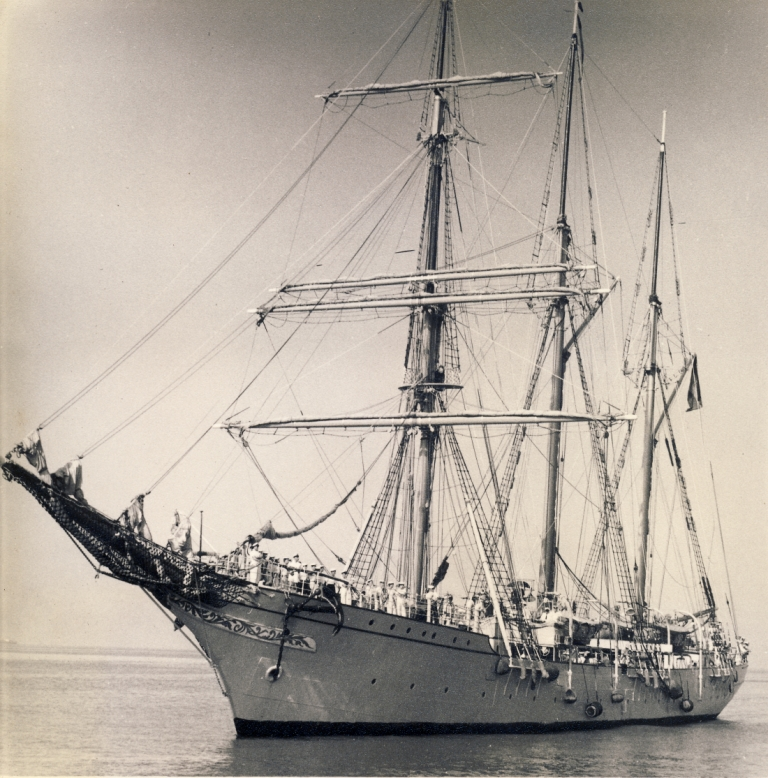
- Belgian barquentine Mercator
- Type: Sailing rig
- Place of origin: Northwest Europe and America

A barquentine or schooner barque (alternatively "barkentine" or "schooner bark") is a sailing vessel with three or more masts, with a square rigged foremast and fore-and-aft rigged main, mizzen and any other masts.

== Modern barquentine sailing rig ==
Barquentine sail plan

While a full-rigged ship is square-rigged on all three masts, and the barque is square-rigged except for the mizzen-mast, the barquentine extends the principle by making only the foremast square-rigged. The advantages of a smaller crew, good performance before the wind and the ability to sail relatively close to the wind while carrying plenty of cargo made it a popular rig at the end of the nineteenth century.

Today, barquentines are popular with modern tall ship and sail training operators as their suite of mainly fore-and-aft sails improve non-downwind performance, while their foremast of square sails offers long distance downwind speed and dramatic appearance in port.

== Etymology ==
The term "barquentine" is seventeenth-century in origin, formed from "barque" in imitation of "brigantine", a two-masted vessel square-rigged only on the forward mast, and apparently formed from the word brig. (Note: Although in fact the term "brig" was a shortening of "brigantine", and for much of the sixteenth to eighteenth century the two terms were synonymous.)

== Historic and modern examples ==
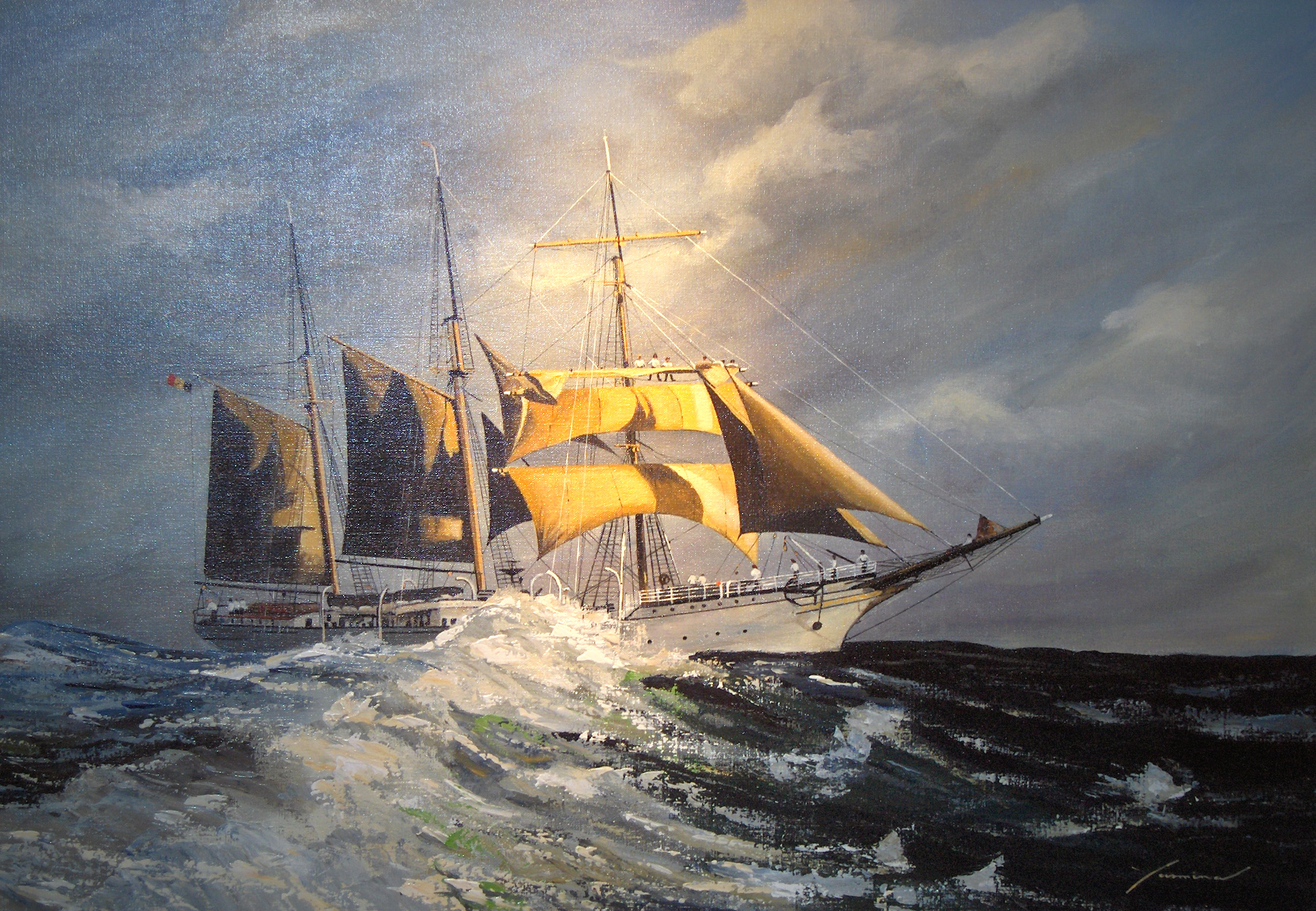
Painting of Mercator by Yasmina

- City of New York, an arctic sailing ship.
- Concordia, a sail training ship that capsized and sank on 17 February 2010.
- KRI Dewaruci of Indonesian Navy, launched and commissioned in 1953, a well-known tall ship used for cadet training and ambassador of the sea, sails around the world and visits many countries.
- 'New Endeavour', a Danish built three masted schooner launched in 1919 in Svendborg as "Dana", in 1968 the rig was altered to barquentine and the ship featured prominently in the Australian TV series Barrier Reef. It was scrapped by fire in the dry dock in Ballina, NSW, due to the inability to raise the required money (about $300,000) to make her seaworthy.
- Endurance, commanded by Ernest Shackleton and crushed by ice in the Weddell Sea during the Imperial Trans-Antarctic Expedition of 1914–17.
- Esmeralda, a sail training ship of the Chilean Navy.
- Gazela Primeiro of 1901.
- Juan Sebastián de Elcano
- STS Leeuwin II, a sail training ship based in Fremantle, Australia.
- Mercator of 1932, Belgian training ship.
- Peacemaker launched 1989.
- Polish-built Pogoria class sail training ships: STS Pogoria, STV Kaliakra, and Iskra (1982).
- Many smaller ships of the late nineteenth century Royal Navy were rigged as barquentines, including the Redbreast-class gunboats.
- Southern Swan, tall ship from 1922 re-rigged as a barquentine from its original rigging as a schooner. Sails on Sydney Harbour for cruises.
- Spirit of New Zealand, 1986 youth development training ship.
- Thor-Heyerdahl
- Transit, an experimental design of 1800 that could be worked entirely from the deck.
