= Braives =

Municipality in Liège Province, Wallonia, Belgium

Braives Braive (Walloon)
- Municipality
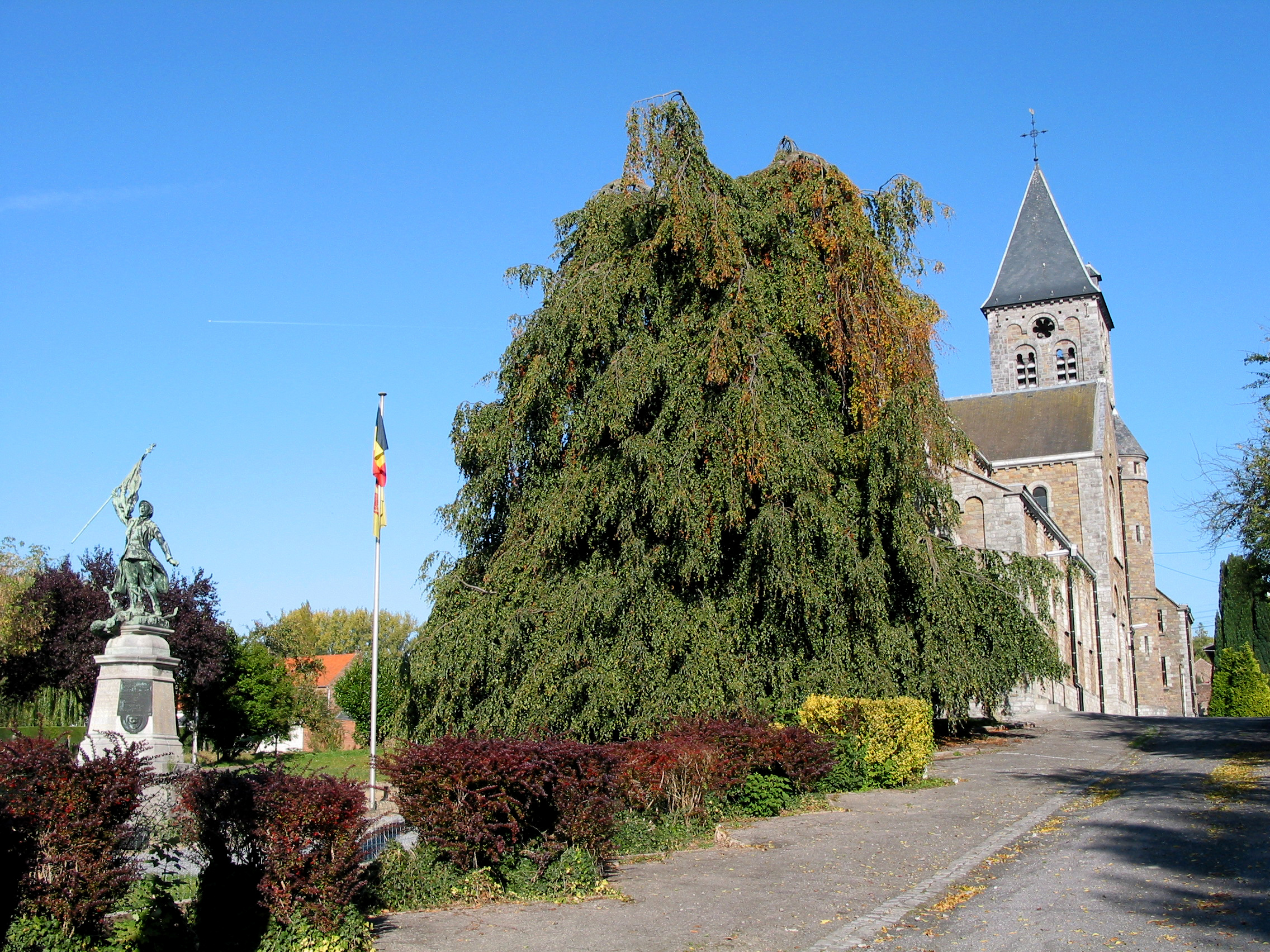

- Flag Coat of arms

- Location of Braives in the province of Liège
- Interactive map of Braives
- Location in Belgium
- Coordinates: 50°38′N 05°09′E
- Country: Belgium
- Community: French Community
- Region: Wallonia
- Province: Liège
- Arrondissement: Waremme

Government
  - Mayor: Pol Guillaume (MR)
  - Governing party: EC

Area
  - Total: 44.05 km^{2} (17.01 sq mi)

Population (2018-01-01)
  - Total: 6,325
  - Density: 143.6/km^{2} (371.9/sq mi)
- Postal codes: 4260, 4261, 4263
- NIS code: 64015
- Area codes: 019
- Website: www.braives.be

Braives (French pronunciation: [bʁɛv]; Walloon: Braive) is a municipality of Wallonia located in the province of Liège, Belgium.

On January 1, 2006, Braives had a total population of 5,579. The total area is 44.00 km^{2} which gives a population density of 127 inhabitants per km^{2}.

The municipality consists of the following districts: Avennes, Braives, Ciplet, Fallais, Fumal, Latinne, Tourinne, and Ville-en-Hesbaye.

There are also three hamlets: Hosdent in Latinne, Pitet in Fallais, and Foncourt in Fumal.

Fallais is famous for its medieval castle and other tourist attractions including a water mill, a former wheelmakershop, the river Méhaigne and the Ravel cycling path.

== Image gallery ==
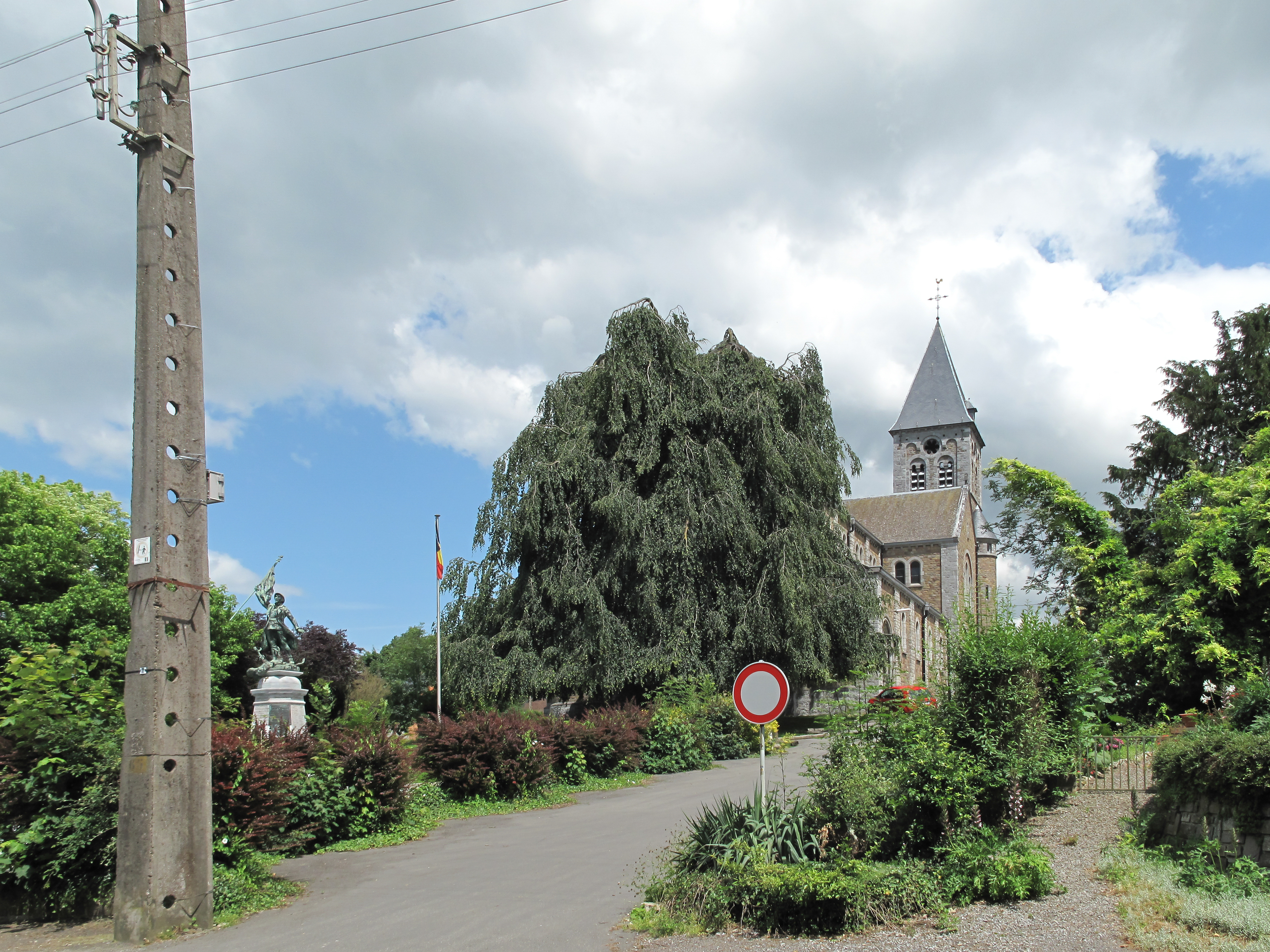
Braives, war memorial and church (église de la Nativité de Notre-Dame)

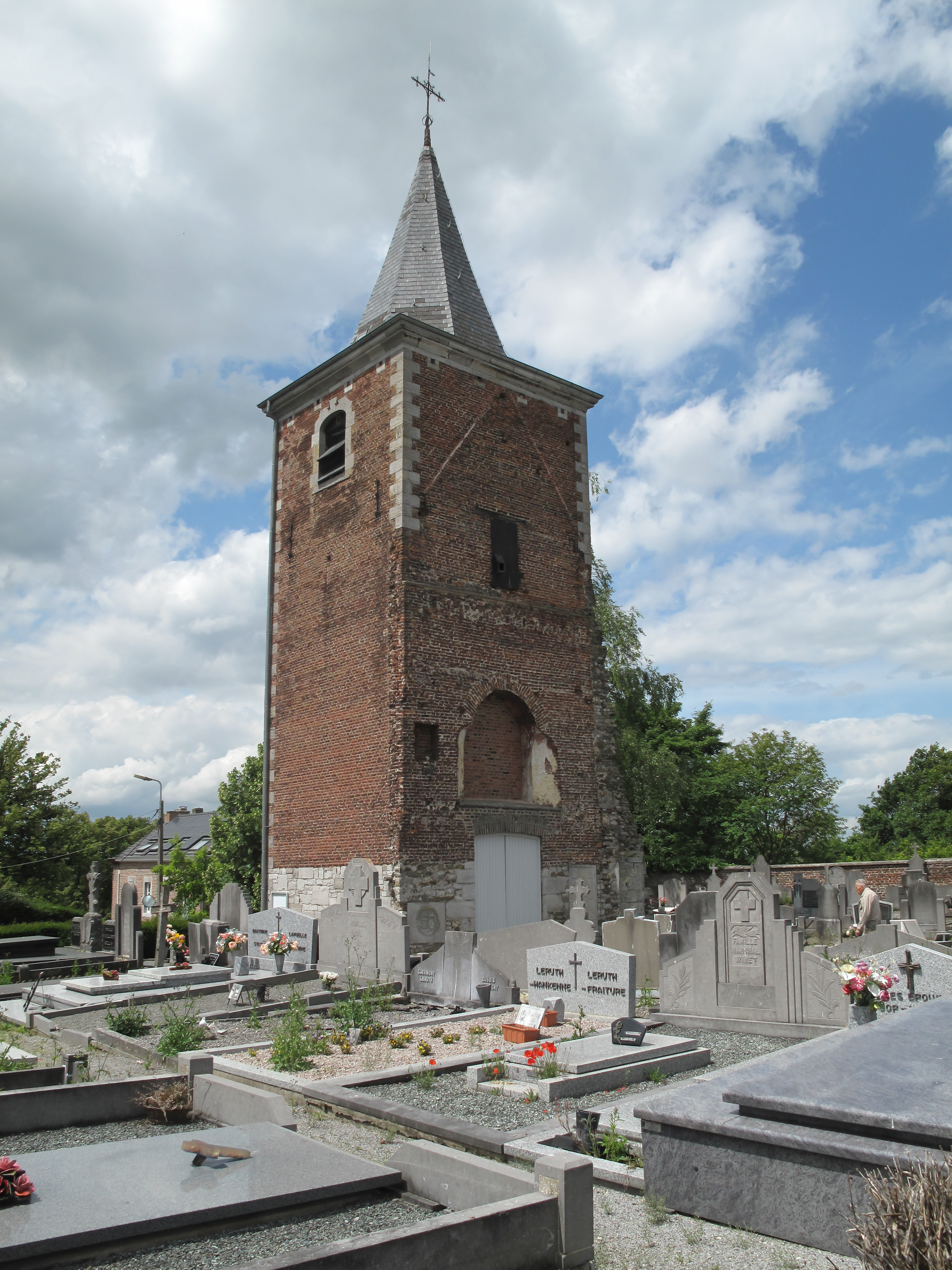
Braives, churchtower: l'église Notre Dame

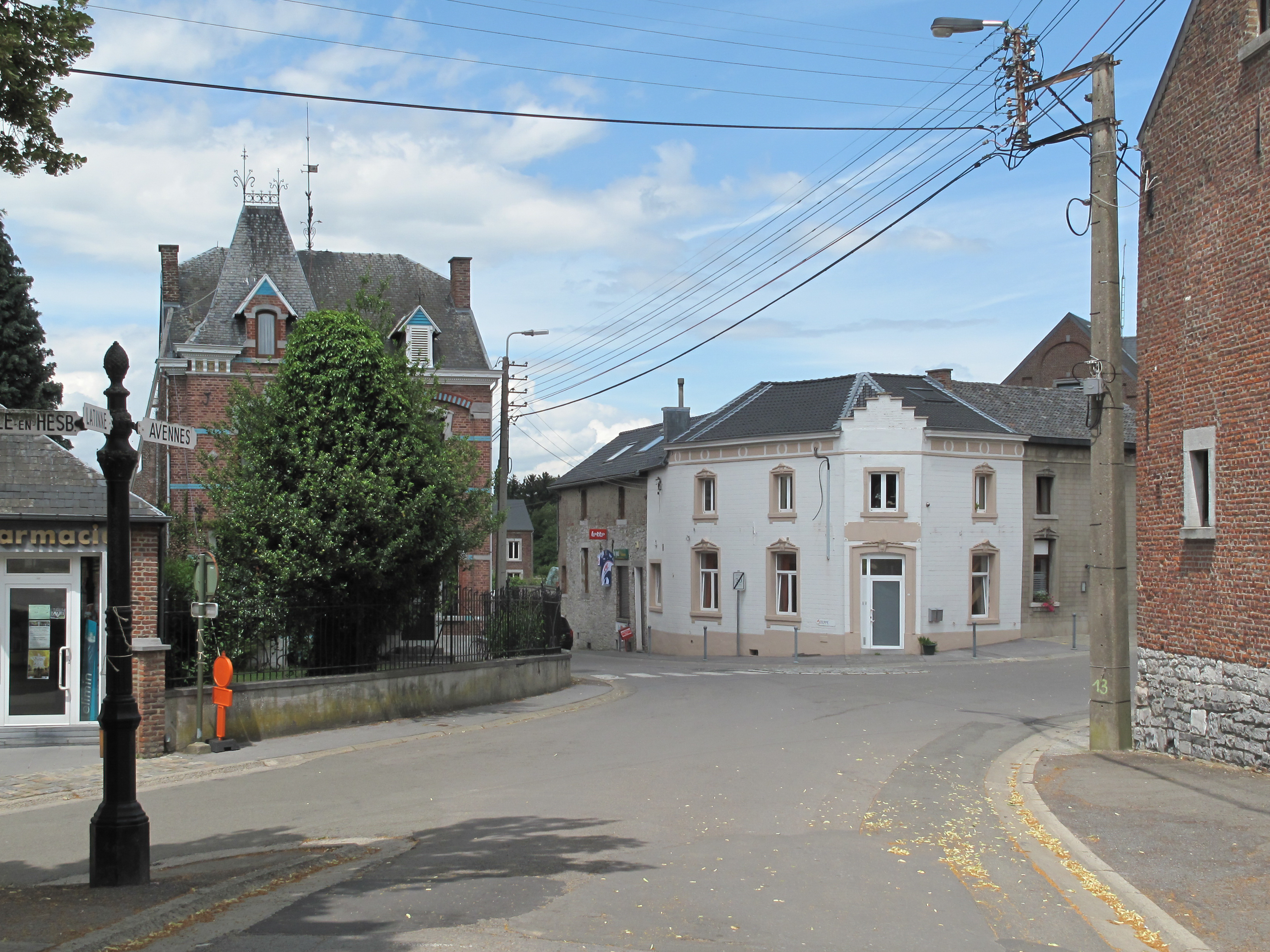
Braives, view to a street: Avenue Guillaume Joachim

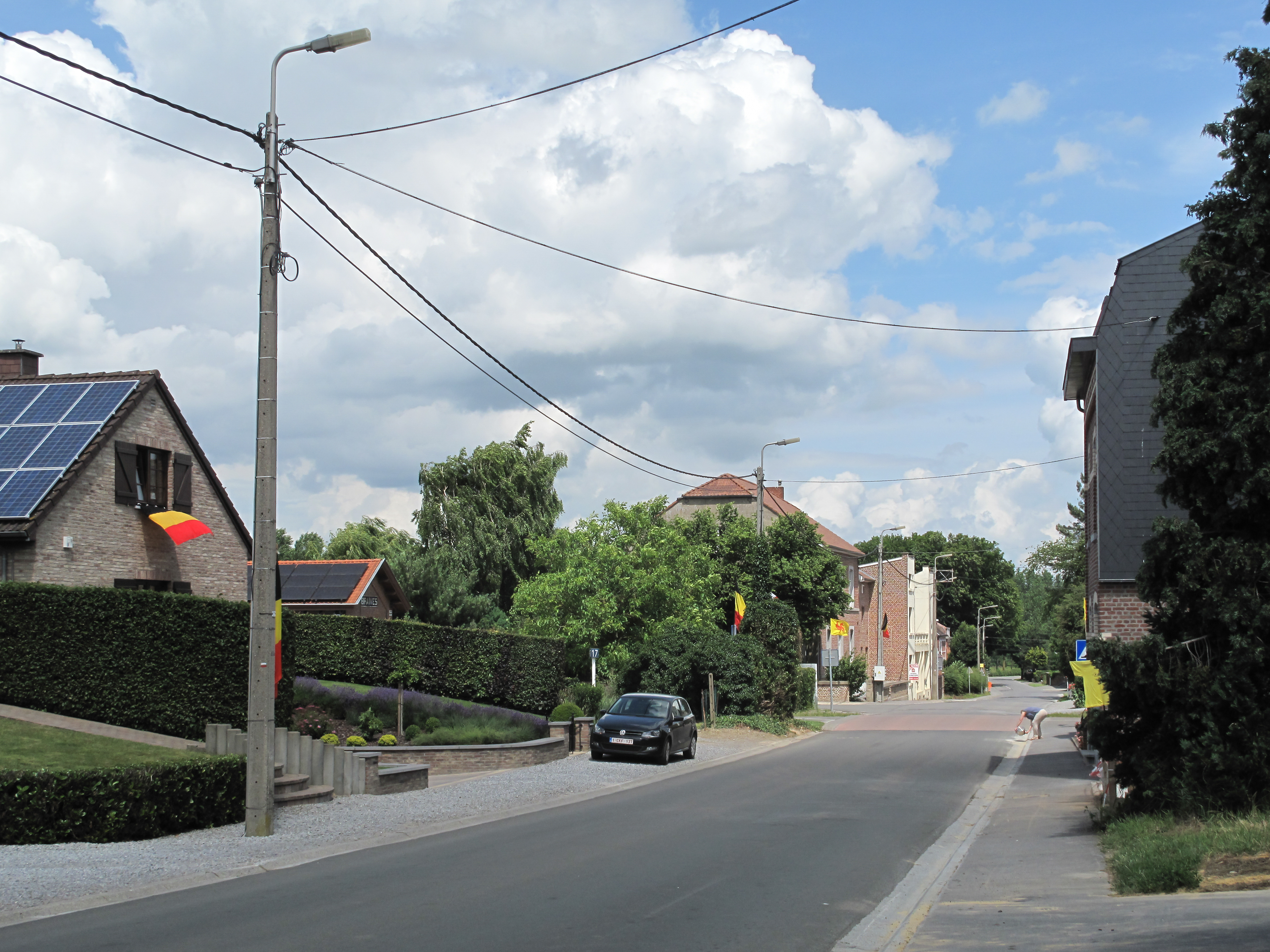
Braives, view to a street

== See also ==
- List of protected heritage sites in Braives
