= 2025 SAIL Amsterdam =

SAIL Amsterdam 2025 was the tenth edition of the maritime event SAIL Amsterdam, held from 20 to 24 August 2025 in Amsterdam, Netherlands. After a ten-year hiatus, the event returned in 2025, having last taken place in 2015. The event featured a parade of tall ships, modern ships, and various naval vessels arriving via the North Sea Canal.

The event attracted 2.5 million visitors.

== Overview ==
SAIL Amsterdam 2025 officially began on 20 August with the traditional Sail-In Parade. During this opening event, a large fleet of tall ships and accompanying vessels sailed from IJmuiden to the IJ harbor in Amsterdam. The spectacle drew large crowds along the canal to witness the arrival of participating ships.

The event showcased a variety of ships, from historical replicas to state-of-the-art sailing vessels. Journalist and sailing enthusiast Toine Heijmans highlighted five particularly noteworthy ships in the 2025 edition, ranging from the smallest to some of the largest participants.

== Themes ==
=== Sustainability ===
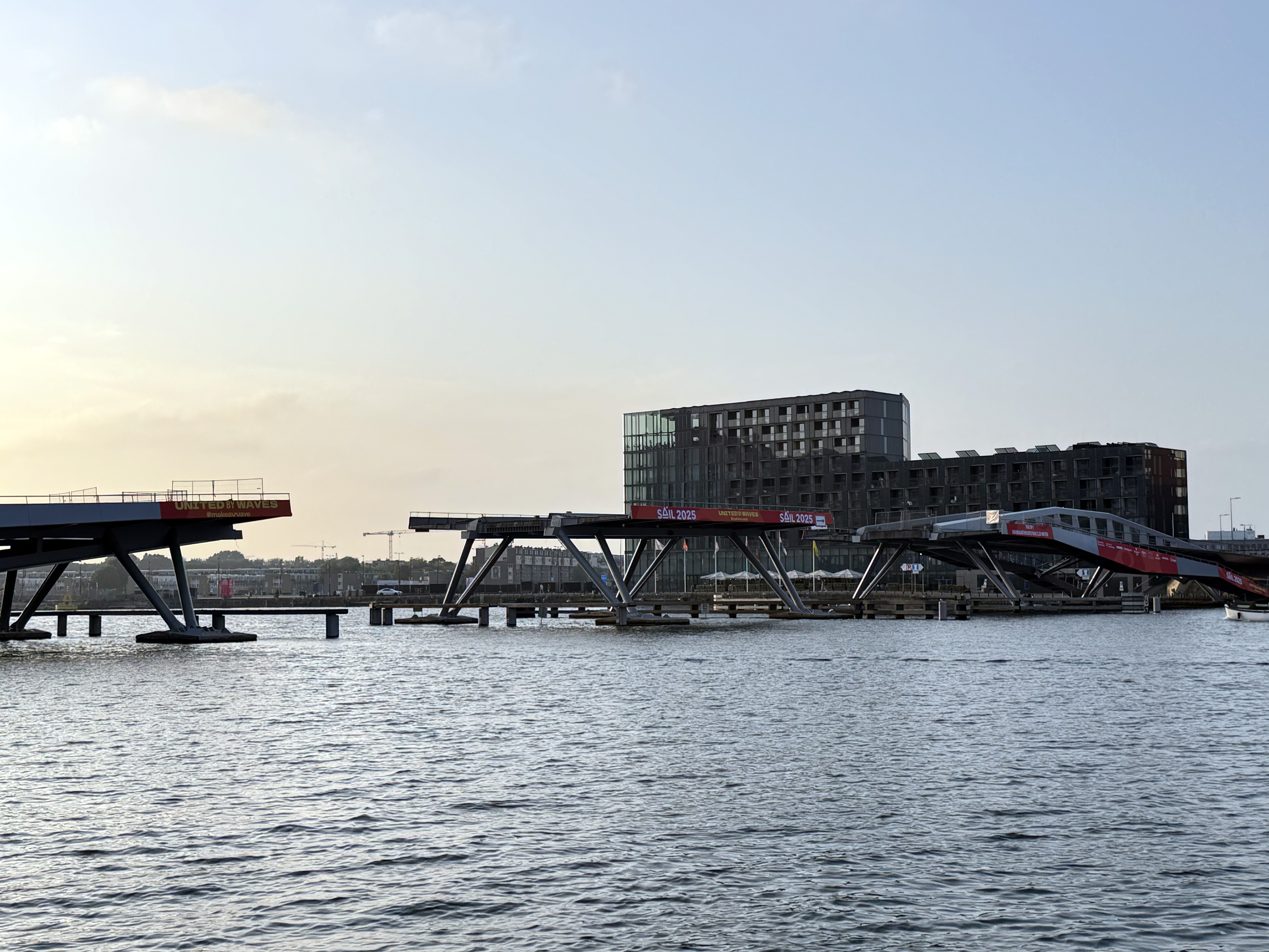
The Jan Schaeferbrug with two removed bridge sections to allow ships to pass.

Around the event, activities were organized to raise awareness about sustainable sailing. On Friday and Saturday, the public could sign up for trial voyages to experience the possibilities of solar-powered and hybrid propulsion. On Saturday, a fleet of historic boats from Plastic Whale sailed from the Oosterdok, with participants actively collecting plastic waste from the water.

Participating historic vessels could refuel with HVO100 biodiesel at a highly attractive rate during Sail 2025. The clipper Stad Amsterdam also sailed on this biofuel during the event.

=== Participating tall ships ===
These tall ships participated for the first time this year:

- Shabab Oman II – training ship of the Royal Navy of Oman
- Gorch Fock – training ship of the German Navy
- BAP Unión – training ship of the Peruvian Navy
- Eye of the Wind – a German brigantine
- Pascual Flores – a Spanish three-masted ship
- Vera Cruz – a Portuguese caravel
- Anna af Sand - a Norwegian Hardangerjakt built in 1854, and one of the oldest wooden sailing cargo ships in Europe still in operation.
- Witte Swaen - Dutch replica of the 16th century Dutch ship used by explorer Willem Barentsz during his 1596 Arctic expedition to find a northern passage to Asia

==== Absences ====
A notable change in 2025 was the absence of Russian tall ships. For the first time, Russian vessels were not invited, due to the ongoing war in Ukraine. In previous editions, Russian ships such as Sedov, Kruzenshtern, and Mir had often been among the largest and most popular attractions. Their absence was a deliberate political decision by the organizers, distancing the event from international tensions. Also, the Mexican training ship Cuauhtémoc had to withdraw as it remained in dock after losing parts of its masts due to a collision with the Brooklyn Bridge in New York.

== Attendance ==
King Willem-Alexander attended the opening of SAIL Amsterdam 2025. His presence marked the importance of the event as a cultural and historical celebration, attracting both national and international attention.

=== Impact on the city ===
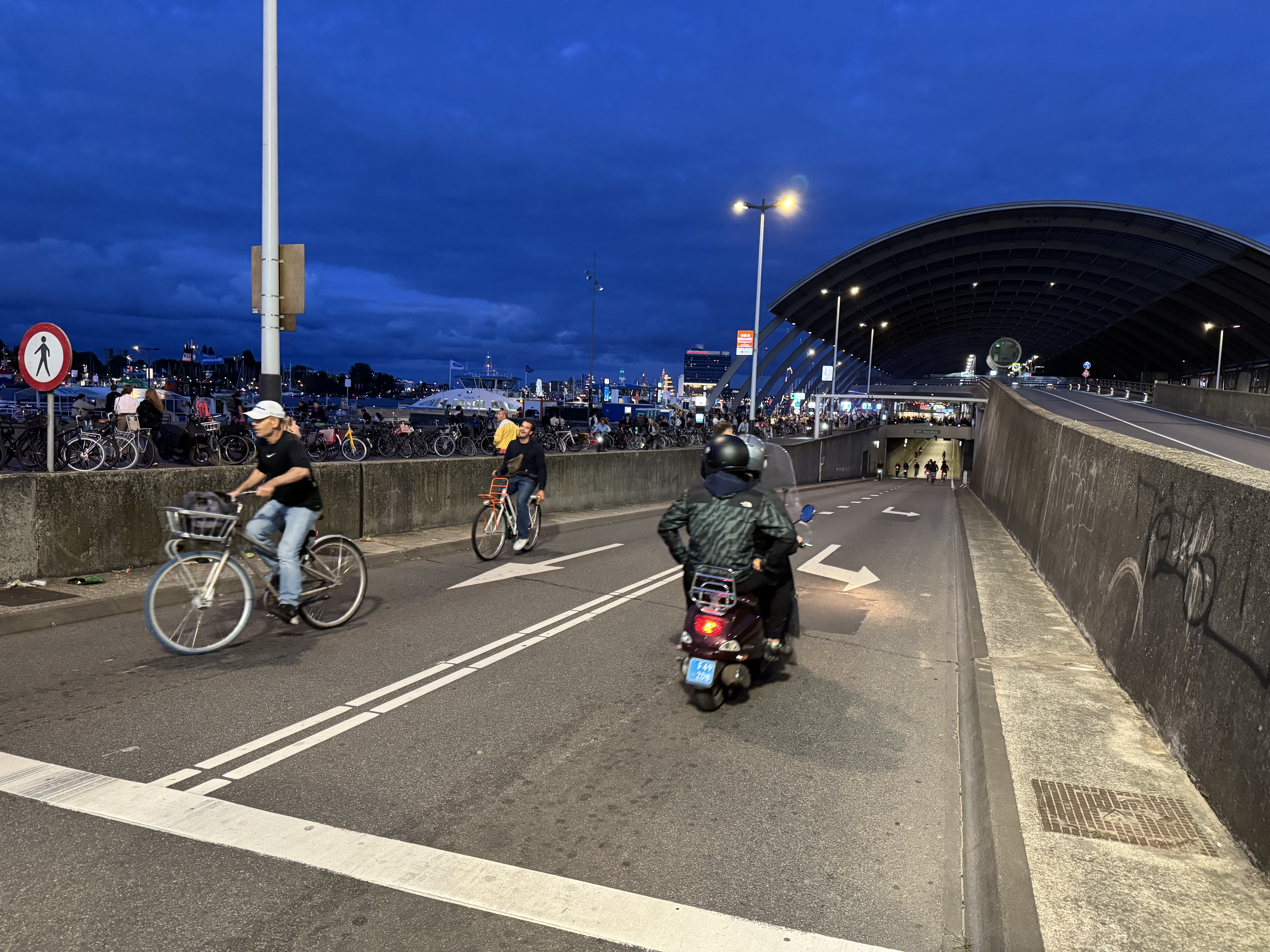
Cyclists and other slow traffic passing through the Michiel de Ruijtertunnel, normally reserved for cars, underneath Amsterdam Central Station.

Sail Amsterdam 2025 was one of the largest national events in the Netherlands. Extensive crowd management measures were implemented in and around the event locations in Amsterdam to handle the large number of visitors. These included the deployment of 300 traffic controllers and the construction of an additional pontoon bridge in the IJhaven. All operations were monitored from the Passenger Terminal Amsterdam. Several roads were closed, and some traffic routes were diverted. The Michiel de Ruijtertunnel, located on the IJ side of Amsterdam Central Station, was closed to regular car traffic. Instead, cyclists and other slow-moving traffic, such as scooters, were allowed to use the tunnel. This created more space for the large flow of pedestrians walking from the northern side of the station toward the IJhaven.
