= Witte Swaen =

16th century Dutch ship

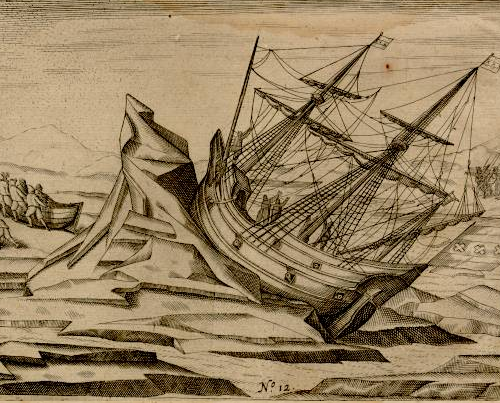

History

Netherlands
- Name: Witte Swaen
- Owner: Amsterdam merchants (expedition funding)
- Operator: Willem Barentsz (expedition commander)
- Out of service: 1597
- Fate: Trapped in ice near Nova Zembla

General characteristics
- Type: Exploration ship
- Crew: 17
- Notes: Arctic expedition to find northern passage to Asia via Nova Zembla

Witte Swaen, in some sources named De Windhond, was a 16th century Dutch ship used by explorer Willem Barentsz during his 1596 Arctic expedition to find a northern passage to Asia. The ship became famous after it was trapped in ice near Nova Zembla, marking a significant chapter in the history of Arctic exploration.

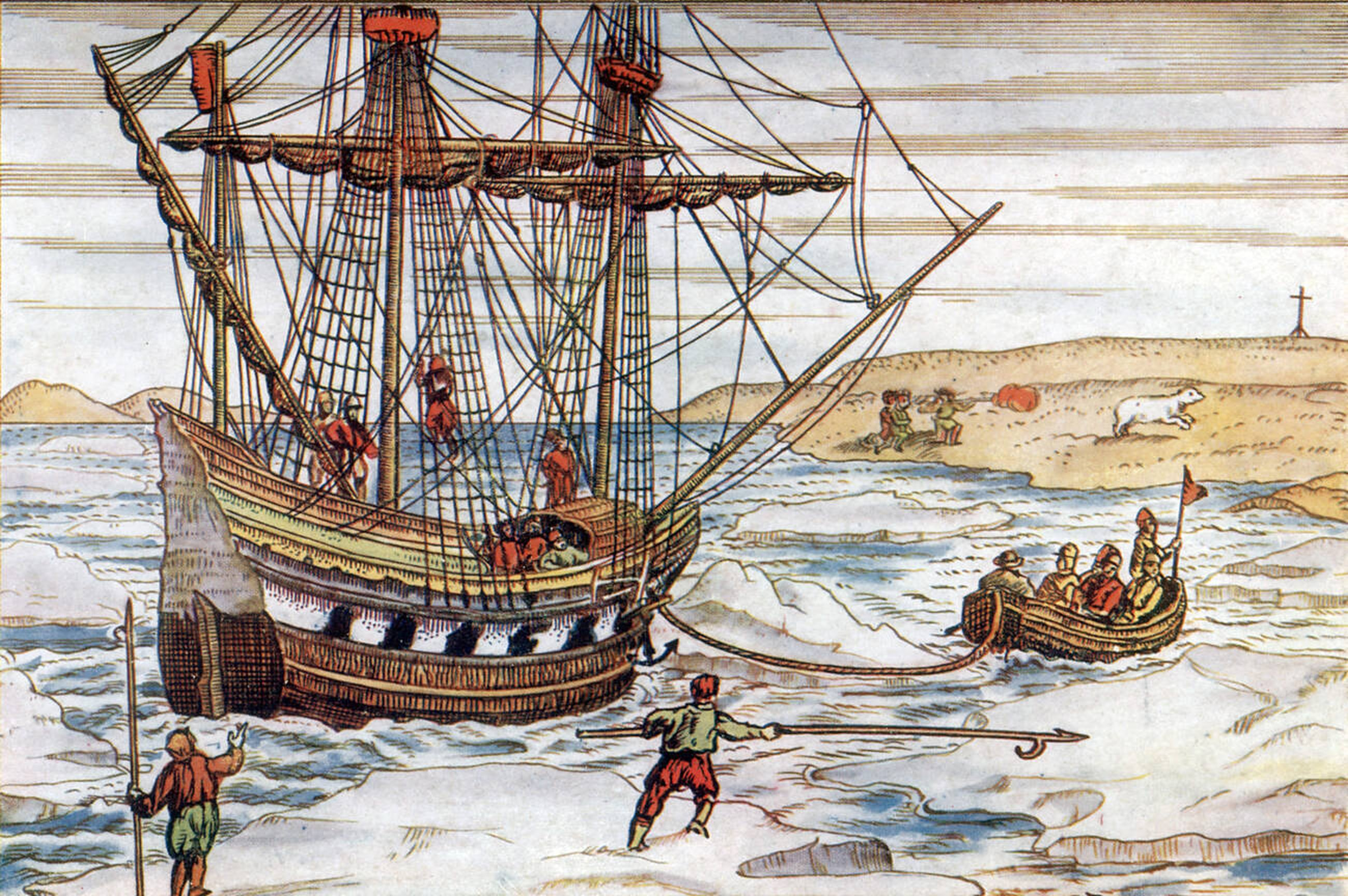
The ship amongst the Arctic ice

In 1596, Barentsz, a seasoned navigator and cartographer, embarked on his journey with the goal of reaching Asia via the Arctic. The expedition was funded by Amsterdam merchants who were eager to find a northern sea route for trade. Despite reaching the northernmost point of the Nova Zembla archipelago, the ship became trapped in the ice, forcing Barentsz and his crew to spend the winter in harsh conditions.

The crew survived by constructing shelter from driftwood and managed to return to the Netherlands the following year. Barentsz, however, died just before they set sail for home. His journey and the fate of Witte Swaen became legendary, symbolizing both the dangers and the ambition of early Dutch exploration. Though Barentsz did not find the northern passage to Asia, the expedition contributed to the understanding of Arctic navigation and is considered an important event in the Age of Exploration.

== Replica ==
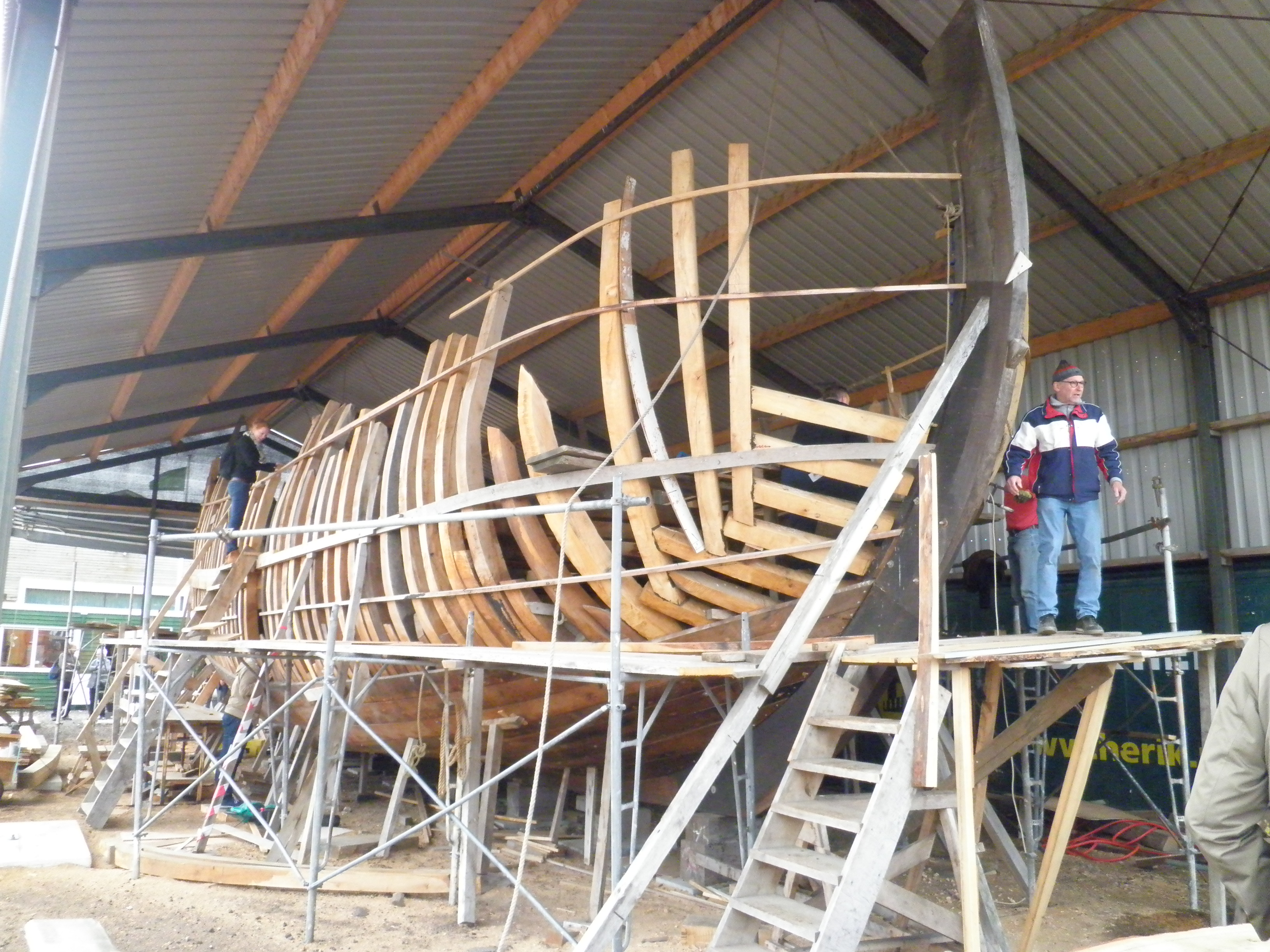
Replica construction in 2014

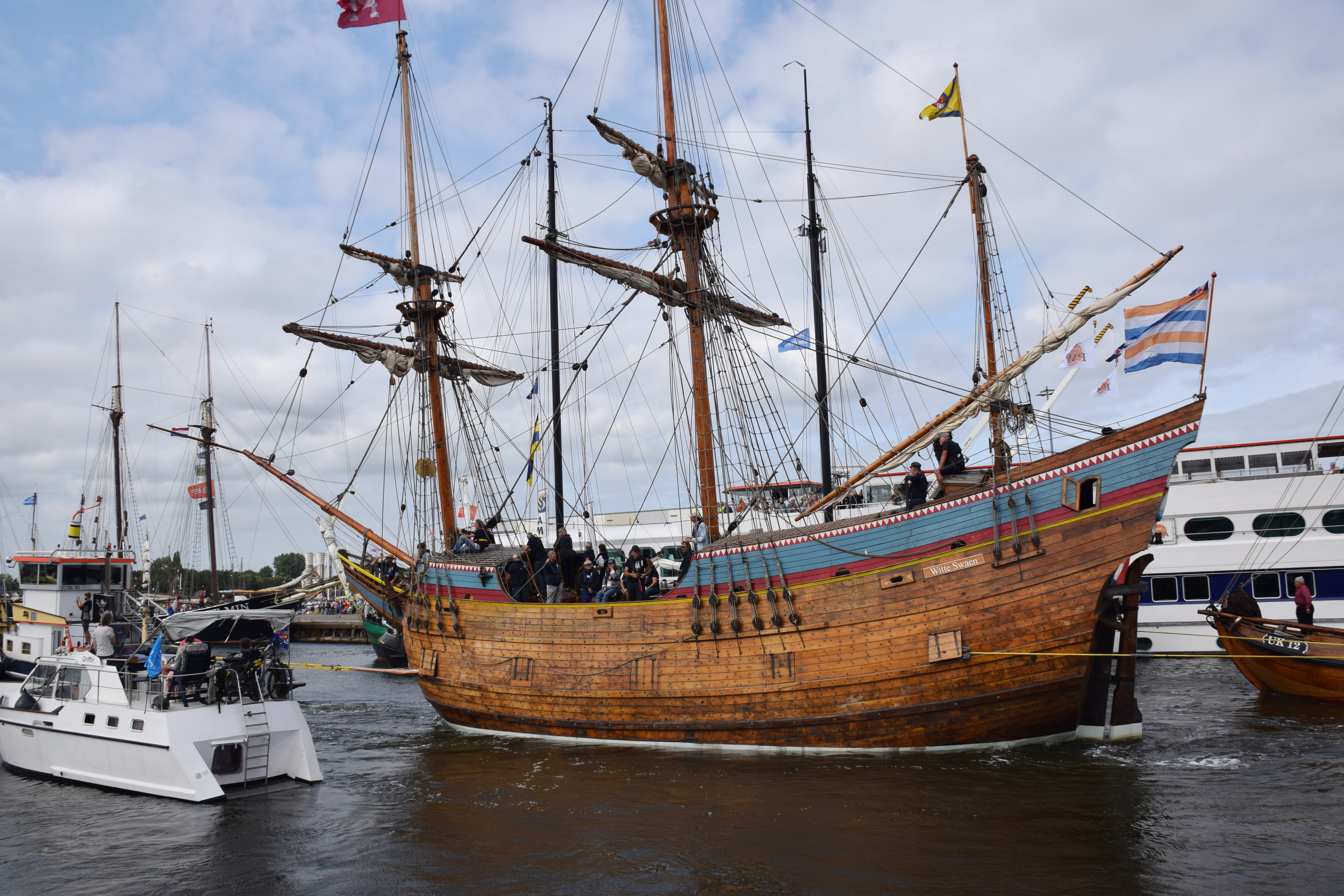
The 2018 replica at 2025 SAIL Amsterdam

In Harlingen, Netherlands, it was decided in 2010 to build a replica of the ship. It was completed after eight years of work by a group of volunteers led by Paul Meijeraan. The replica was built at Harlingen and was designed to faithfully replicate the original ship. The construction of the replica served as a tribute to Barentsz's pioneering Arctic expedition. In 2018, the replica, named Witte Swaen, was christened and launched by Princess Margriet.

The replica was first tested in 2023 with a successful trial voyage. The project was fueled by the desire to honor the legacy of Barentsz and the historic journey of the original Witte Swaen. The replica was set to participate in the 2025 SAIL Amsterdam event, marking the 750th anniversary of Amsterdam and the 50th anniversary of the Sail event.

However, the modern replica could not travel via the IJsselmeer to Amsterdam as it does not meet the required inland shipping regulations. Instead, the replica was towed from Harlingen to Amsterdam, with funding for the journey raised through a public sponsorship campaign. The replica of Witte Swaen serves as both a historical monument and a testament to the enduring legacy of early Dutch exploration.
