= Karel Doorman class =

Karel Doorman class are classes of which the lead ships are named after Dutch naval mariner Karel Doorman.

Karel Doorman class may refer to:

- Karel Doorman-class frigate
- Karel Doorman-class support ship
