= HNLMS Karel Doorman (A833) =

Multi-function support ship

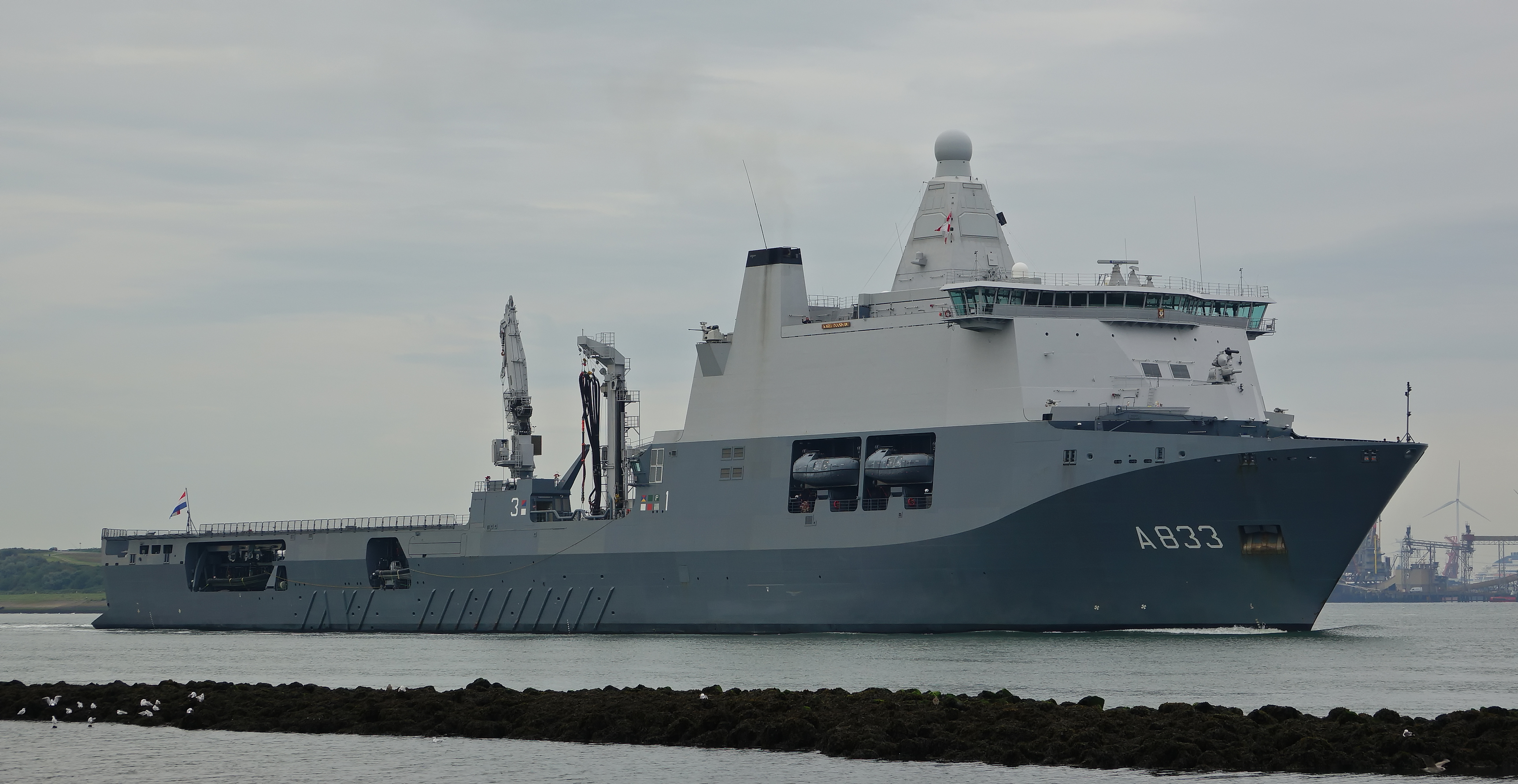
- Karel Doorman at Rotterdam in September 2017

Class overview
- Name: Karel Doorman class
- Operators: Royal Netherlands Navy
- Preceded by: HNLMS Zuiderkruis, HNLMS Amsterdam
- Cost: 363 million euro (480 million USD)
- Built: 2011–2014
- Completed: 1

History

Netherlands
- Name: Karel Doorman
- Namesake: Karel Doorman
- Builder: Galați shipyard, Romania; Damen Schelde Naval Shipbuilding, Netherlands (fitting out)
- Laid down: 7 June 2011
- Launched: 17 October 2012
- Commissioned: 24 April 2015
- Home port: Den Helder
- Identification: MMSI number: 244173000; Callsign: PADA; Deck code: KD
- Motto: "All Ships Follow Me"
- Status: Active

General characteristics
- Type: Joint support ship
- Displacement: 27,800 tonnes (27,361 long tons) full load
- Length: 204.7 m (671 ft 7 in)
- Beam: 30.4 m (99 ft 9 in)
- Draught: 7.8 m (25 ft 7 in)
- Propulsion: Diesel-electric; 4 × Rolls-Royce Bergen V12A diesel generators 5.5 MW; 1 × Rolls-Royce Bergen L6A diesel generator 2.8 MW; 2 × Converteam/GE electric motors 8.9 MW; 2 × Rolls-Royce CPP propellers; 2 × Wärtsilä Bow thruster, 1.25 MW; 1 × Wärtsilä Stern thruster, 0.75 MW
- Speed: 18 knots (33 km/h; 21 mph)
- Range: 9,800 nmi (18,100 km; 11,300 mi) at 12 kn (22 km/h; 14 mph)
- Boats & landing craft carried: 2 × Landing craft vehicle personnel; 2 × RHIB; Landing beach for Landing craft utility
- Complement: 150 crew, 150 non-enlisted persons (Helicopter crews, medical teams)
- Sensors & processing systems: Thales Nederland integrated mast; Thales SeaMaster 400 SMILE air warning radar; Thales SeaWatcher 100 SeaStar surface detection radar; Thales Gatekeeper electro-optical surveillance system; Thales SCOUT Mk 3 low probability of intercept shipborne surveillance radar
- Armament: 2 × Goalkeeper CIWS; 2 × 30 mm Marlin WS rapid fire gun; 4 × 12.7 mm Hitrole NT machine gun; 6–8 x 7.62 mm FN MAG machine gun
- Aircraft carried: Up to 6 × NH90 NFH or H215M Cougar with blades folded or 2 × CH-47F Chinook with blades spread.
- Aviation facilities: Two-spot helideck and hangar for up to 6 medium helicopters

HNLMS Karel Doorman (Dutch: Zr.Ms. Karel Doorman) is a multi-function support ship for amphibious operations of the Royal Netherlands Navy, which is also used by the German Navy. The ship replaced both of the navy's replenishment oilers: HNLMS Zuiderkruis (scrapped in February 2014) and HNLMS Amsterdam (sold to Peru in December 2014). At 204.7 m (671 ft 7 in) she is the largest ship in service with the Royal Netherlands Navy.

She was built at the Damen yard in Galați, Romania, being the largest warship ever built in Romania. On 16 August 2013 the ship arrived in Vlissingen, the Netherlands, where final outfitting and installation of the weapon systems took place. In September 2013, it was announced that as part of a series of Dutch defense budget cuts, the vessel would not enter military service, but this decision was reversed by the Dutch government. The vessel cost €400 million.

On 4 February 2016, German minister Ursula von der Leyen, and Dutch minister Jeanine Hennis-Plasschaert signed a Letter of Intent to share Karel Doorman.

The ship is named after Dutch naval officer Karel Doorman who was killed in action in World War II during the Battle of the Java Sea.

== Characteristics ==
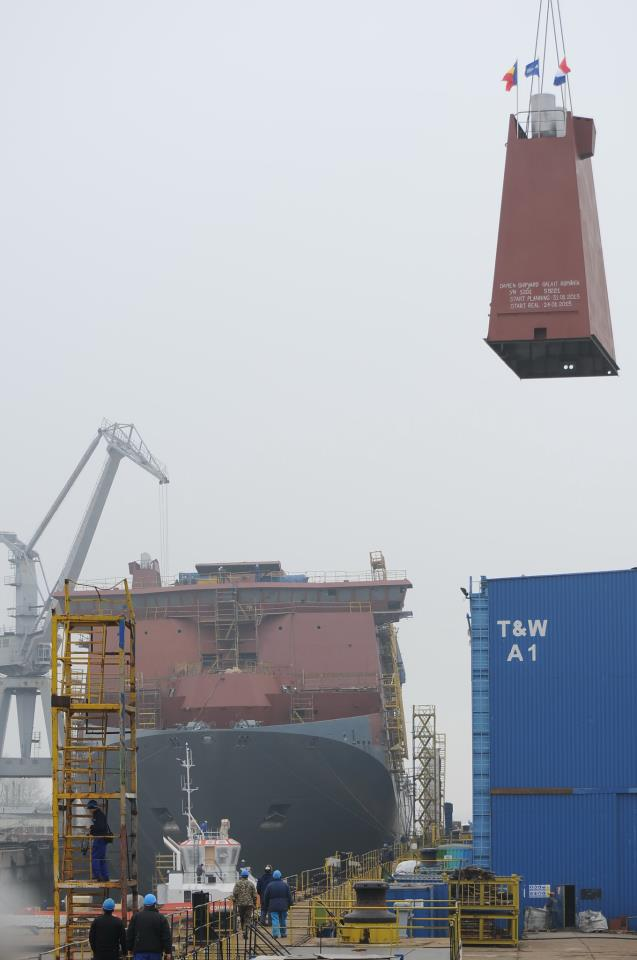
Last section being placed

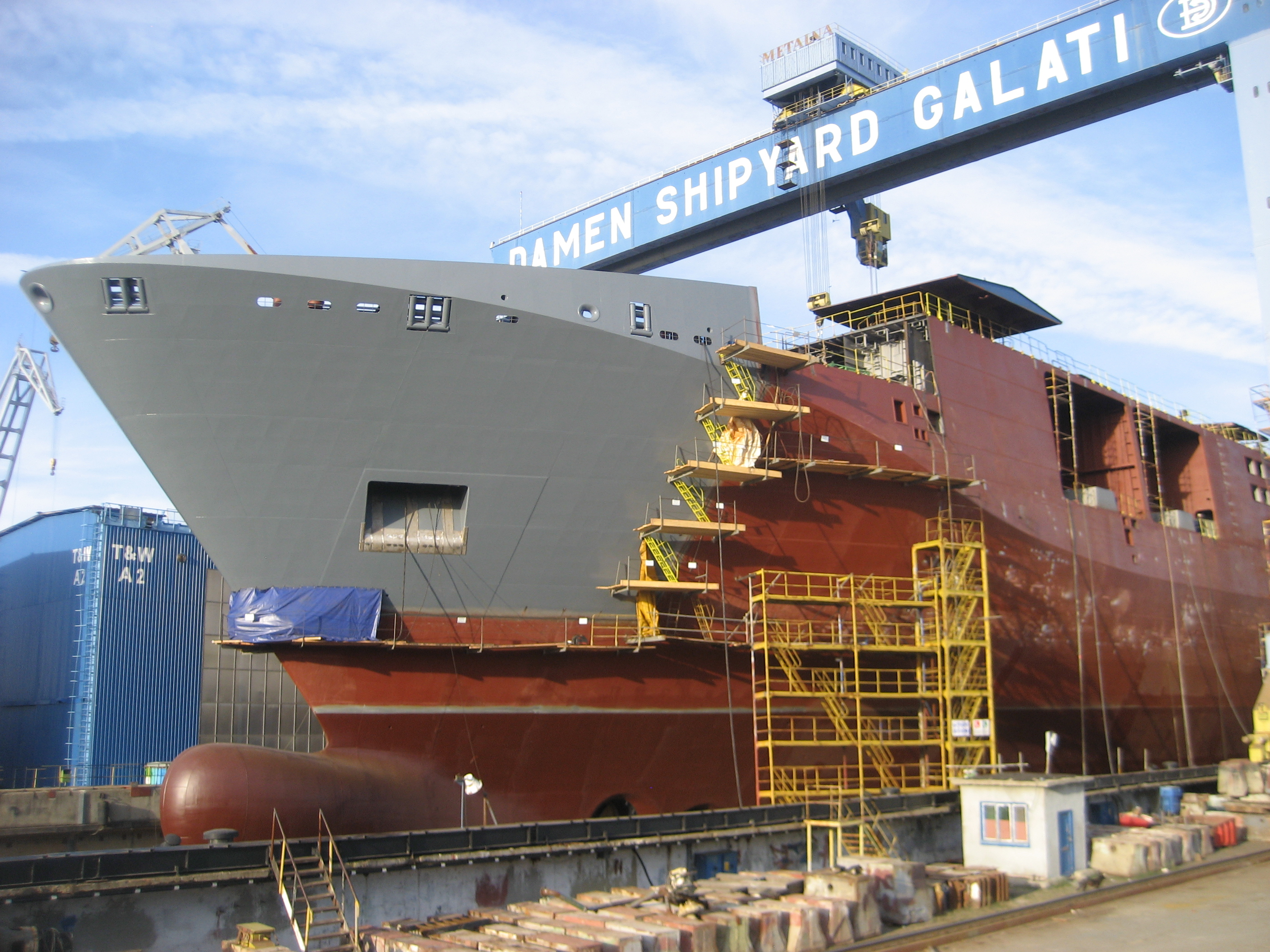
Construction of bow

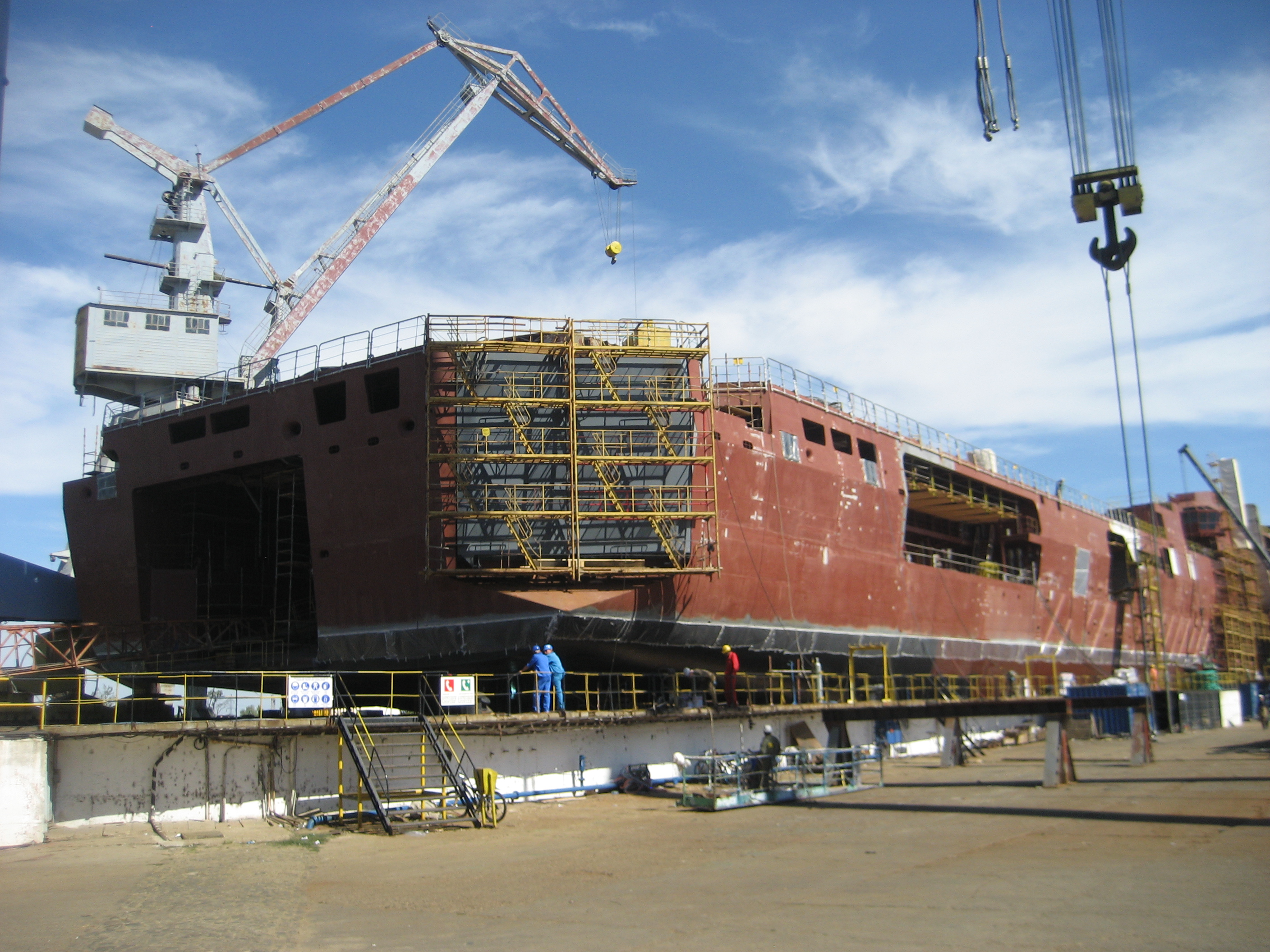
Construction of stern

For maritime support the ship will have two replenishment-at-sea masts, the holding capacity of approx. 8,000 m^{3} (1,800,000 imp gal; 2,100,000 US gal) of fuel, more than 1,000 m^{3} (220,000 imp gal; 260,000 US gal) of helicopter fuel, approximately 450 m^{3} (99,000 imp gal; 120,000 US gal) of potable water, and approximately 400 tons of ammunition and other supplies.

The JLSS has 2,000 lane meters for transport of material such as tracked and wheeled vehicles or containers. She has an elevator and crane for up to 40 tons, a roll on/roll off facility for vehicles, and a steel beach stern construction for accommodating cargo transfer via landing craft. The ship is equipped with two landing craft vehicle personnel.

For sea-basing operations she has a large helicopter deck with landing spots for operating two CH-47F Chinooks simultaneously, and a hangar with a storage capacity of up to six medium-sized helicopters, including NH90 NFHs.

The ship can accommodate up to 300 personnel, of which 159 are the ship's crew. She also has command rooms for war staffs and a large hospital facility with 20 treatment areas, and two surgery rooms. Modular flexibility allows configuration of temporary areas for evacuees or prisoners.

Positioned off shore, the ship is designed to act as a Sea Based Operations Platform supporting (amphibious) land forces with logistic support providing supplies and helicopter support (transport and attack).

=== Armament ===
The armament of the JLSS is heavier than that of landing platform docks and replenishment ships, but is still primarily for self defence. In high-risk operations the ship will require additional protection from frigates or destroyers.

Two Goalkeeper CIWS systems protect the ship against incoming missiles and aircraft at short range, while two Oto Melara Marlin WS 30 mm rapid cannons provide force-protection against small surface targets such as high speed boats. The ship is also equipped with four Oto Melara Hitrole NT 12.7 mm guns. The same weaponry has been chosen for the Holland-class offshore patrol vessels. All weapon systems of the JLSS are remote-controlled from the operations and command room.

=== Sensor suite ===
Karel Doorman has the same sensor suite as the Holland class. All sensor systems are housed in an integrated mast, provided by Thales Nederland, called the I-Mast 400, comprising a SeaMaster 400 SMILE air warning radar, a SeaWatcher 100 active phased-array surface detection and tracking radar and the GateKeeper infra-red/electro-optical (EO) warning system. With these systems the ship is able to monitor 140 nm using an Integrated Sensor and Communication Systems (ISCS), also by Thales Nederland.

== Mid-life upgrade ==
Karel Doorman is planned to undergoing progressive updates to extend its service life from 2025 onwards. Major changes that are expected include the replacement of the Goalkeeper CIWS with RIM-116 Rolling Airframe Missile and 76 mm Sovraponte gun from Leonardo OTO.

== Ships in class ==
Pennant number	Ship	Laid down	Launched	Commissioned
A833	Karel Doorman	7 June 2011	17 October 2012	29 April 2015

== Service history ==
From May 2014 onward the Karel Doorman performed several sea trials and tests, which included testing the rescue system. In September that same year the ship had already successfully passed some sea trials.

Even though Karel Doorman had just finished sea trials and had not yet been commissioned, on 6 November she was sent on a three-month deployment to West Africa to deliver aid to Ebola-struck countries. She was loaded with different goods in more than 50 containers and 100 vehicles. On 18 November the ship arrived in Freetown, Sierra Leone for her first offload. After her third offload in Liberia and the replenishment of RFA Argus the ship returned to the Netherlands to resupply.

On 24 April 2015 Karel Doorman was formally commissioned and hence forward used the prefix HNLMS and given the pennant A833. On 17 June 2015, she docked at Phillipsburg in Sint Maarten. On 19 June she docked at Oranjestad, Aruba.

On 3 February 2016, Karel Doorman docked at Amsterdam in the Netherlands. In February it was decided that the Royal Netherlands Navy would incidentally share the use of Karel Doorman with the German Navy.

In late 2017 Karel Doorman was sent to the Caribbean Sea for humanitarian aid after the region was struck by Hurricane Irma. Karel Doorman participated in the NATO military exercise Trident Juncture in 2018.

In 2020 Karel Doorman was sent to the Dutch Caribbean to provide support during the COVID-19 pandemic. Besides providing support, the ship also performed maritime border surveillance in the Caribbean Sea together with HNLMS Zeeland.

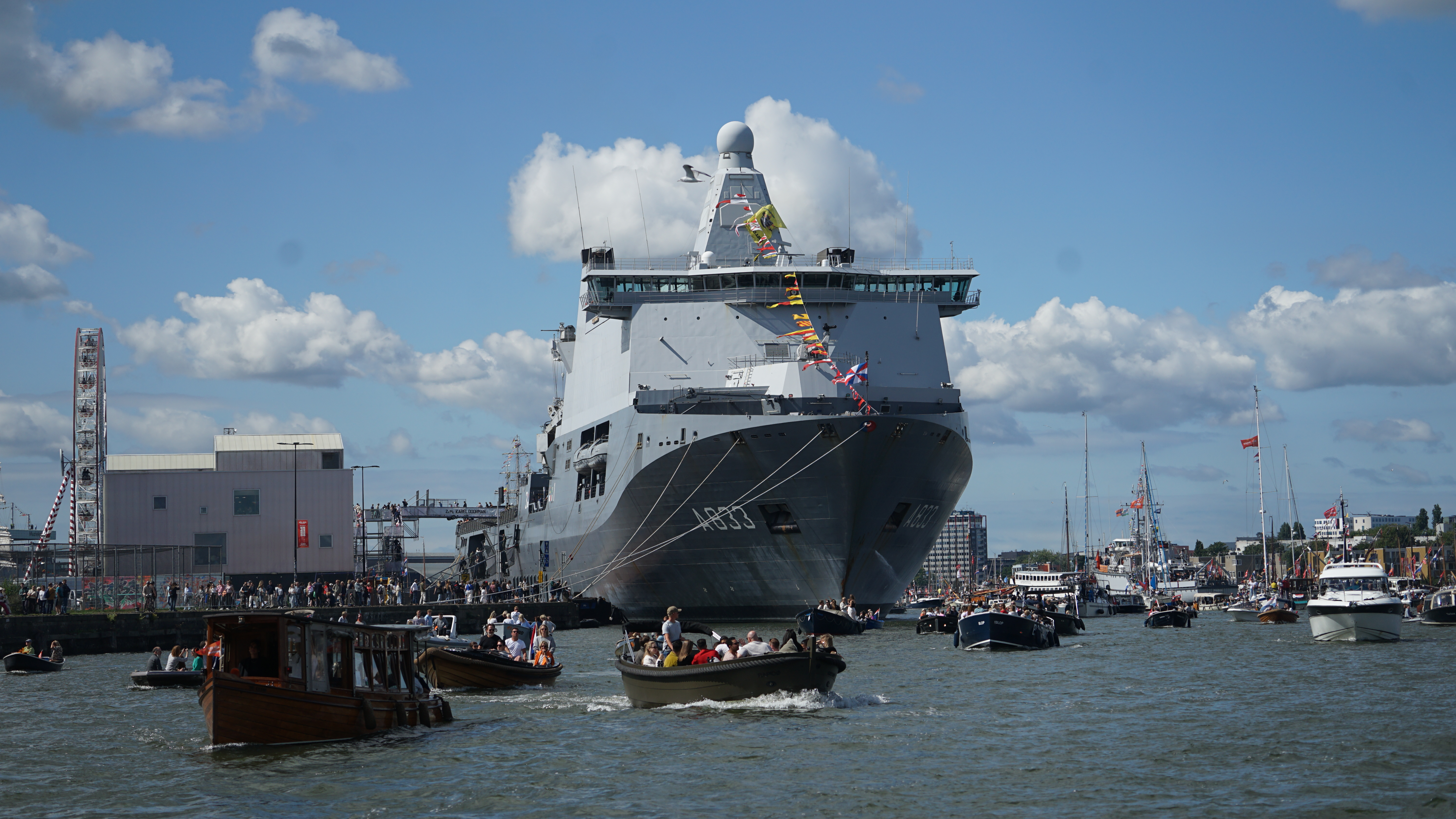
Karel Doorman at SAIL Amsterdam 2025

On 7 May 2022, Karel Doorman was tasked as flagship of NATO's Standing NATO Maritime Group 1 in the North and Baltic seas. She took on board the German Seebataillon as boarding team. The overall task was to grow in cooperation with NATO allies and perform missions for NATO command.

On 21 April 2024, Karel Doorman departed the Netherlands to take part in Operation Aspides and provide associated support for Operation Prosperity Guardian in the Red Sea, embarking a H215M Cougar and a Swedish surgical team. The tasking was delayed in early May as issues arose with the Goalkeeper CIWS, causing the ship to return to Crete Naval Base for repairs until setting sail for the area of operations on 10 May. On 13 June, an air medical evacuation of a heavily wounded crewmember was conducted from the ship MV Verbena to Karel Doorman after Verbena was hit by two Houthi anti-ship missiles.

Karel Doorman took part in SAIL Amsterdam from 20 to 24 August 2025.

In March 2026 it was reported that Karel Doorman will undergo major maintenance for a duration of 11 months.

== Export ==
In January 2023 it was announced that the Irish Naval Service is evaluating the possible acquisition of a down-sized version of Karel Doorman for their Multi-role vessel program. Another contender is a version of the Canterbury design from New Zealand.
