= Sørlandet (ship) =

Full-rigged ship built in 1927

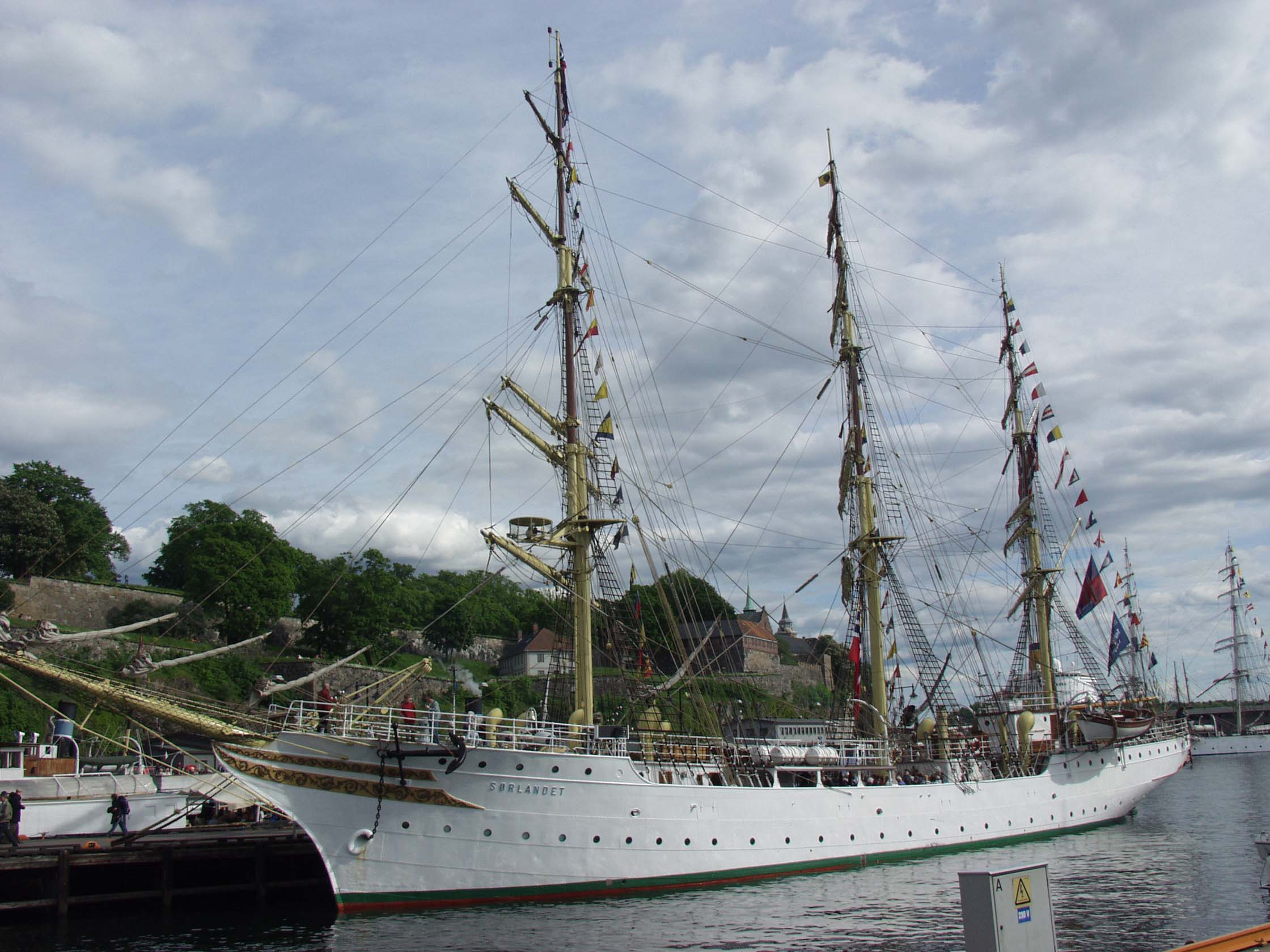
- Sørlandet in Oslo, June 2005

History

Norway
- Name: Sørlandet
- Namesake: Sørlandet
- Builder: Høivolds Mek. Verksted, Kristiansand
- Launched: 1927
- In service: 1927
- Status: Active

General characteristics
- Tonnage: 499 tons gross
- Displacement: 891 tons
- Length: Sparred Length: 64,15 m
- Beam: 9 m
- Height: 34,2 m
- Draft: 4,5 m
- Depth: 5,2 m
- Speed: 14 knots (engine) / 17 knots (sails) (can go higher but hull is not made to withstand it)

Name pennant of the Sørlandet, usually flown from the ship's main mast

Sørlandet at the SAIL Amsterdam event in 2010

Sørlandet is a Norwegian heritage tall ship and one of very few full-rigged ships in the world. She is the senior of the existing Norwegian built square riggers, and for more than 50 years she has held a central position in the education and training of young people. She is the second oldest of three Norwegian tall ships, the “Great Trio of Norway”, which besides her includes Statsraad Lehmkuhl and Christian Radich.

== History ==
Construction on the Sørlandet was started in 1925 at Høivolds Mek shipyard in the city of Kristiansand on the south coast of Norway based on a £25,000 grant from ship owner O.A.T. Skjelbred. Completed on 28 May 1927, she measured 210 feet in length and 577 gross tons. She was given the name Sørlandet after the Norwegian region from where she originates.

=== Maiden voyage ===
On her maiden voyage to Oslo in 1927, Sørlandet was inspected by King Haakon and Crown Prince Olav. Later in the same year, she set sail for London with 90 young trainees on board.

=== Training vessel: Sørlandet’s Seilende Skoleskibs Institution ===
The original intention behind mr. Skjelbreds grant was the establishment of a training institution called Sørlandets Seilende Skoleskibs Institution for young sailors, and with it the construction of a fully rigged tall ship with a steel hull that could house 80 cadets and their officers. As part of “Sørlandet’s Seilende Skoleskibs Institution,” the Sørlandet played a vital role in the education of young seamen from the southern region of Norway. The young men who received their training onboard disembarques as seamen and went in to service in the Norwegian Merchant Marine or in the Royal Navy.

=== World Exhibit 1933 ===
She sailed to Chicago to take part in the World Fair in 1933. Being the first Norwegian training ship to cross the Atlantic Ocean, she actually served as the Norwegian pavilion during the exhibition "Century of Progress".

=== World War II ===
The ship was in continuous service as a training vessel for the Norwegian Merchant Marine until 1939, when World War II started. The same year, she was chartered by the Royal Norwegian Navy and used as a depot ship in the naval port of Horten where the Germans seized her in April 1940. She was damaged during the war and served as an accommodation vessel for German submariners. At the end of the war she was in a degrading condition. She was restored and ready to sail in 1948.

In 1958 she was equipped with an engine, as one of the last European tall ships.

=== The 1970s ===
In 1974 she was no longer used as a public training vessel and was sold to ship owner Jan Staubo. She was registered in Arendal and laid up at anchor in Kilsund for three years. In 1977 she was again bought by Skjelbreds Rederi A/S and presented as a gift to the city of Kristiansand. She was in great need for repairs, and through governmental and municipal funds, plus extensive voluntary labour and personal donations, she was completely restored.

=== The 1980s ===
After the repairs of the late 1970s, she was again back in service in July 1980. Some 300 trainees from 10 different nations took part in her international friendship cruises that year. Most of the foreign trainees came from the UK and USA. Both young women and men were that time on accepted.

In 1981 a foundation was established; "Stiftelsen Fullriggeren Sørlandet" has been the owner and operator of the vessel since. From 1980 to 1983 Sørlandet was the only operating Norwegian sail training ship, and the first open to men and women of all ages and nationalities.

Since 1982 she has made several Atlantic crossings, visiting ports in the US and Canada and in the Caribbean. In all these years she has carried out a series of summer cruises in the North and Baltic Sea and visited ports on the European continent. She was also features in an American film shoot for Shearson American express. In 1982, Sørlandet hosted the exhibition "Women of the Coast" whilst visiting some 60 seaside destinations along Norwegian shoreline, sailing as far north as Kirkenes. A total of 83,000 people visited Sørlandet during this tour. In 1986 she once again crossed the Atlantic to take part in the 100th Anniversary of the Statue of Liberty in New York City. From 1986 to 1988 about 500 cadets from the Royal Norwegian Navy got their first life-at-sea experience through six-week courses, sailing and training aboard Sørlandet.

=== The 1990s ===
In the latter half of the 1990s she was affiliated with the Royal Norwegian Navy, Norwegian Ship Owners' Association and the local public employment office with which she offered six-week courses in sailing and seamanship to bolster the recruitment of young seafarers.

=== The 2010s ===
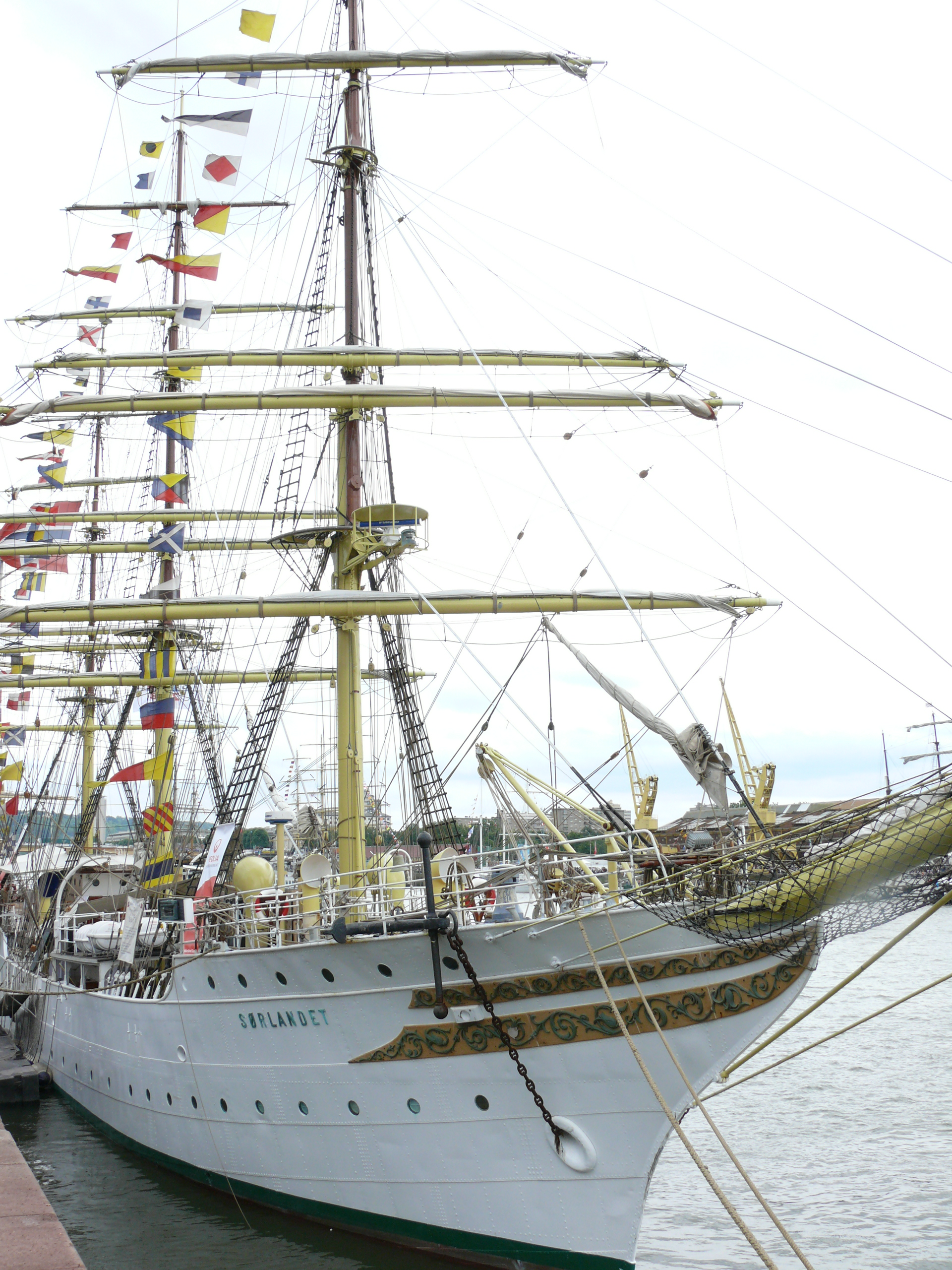
Sørlandet in Rouen

From 2010 to 2014, Sørlandet hosted the Canadian school West Island College International for its program, "Class Afloat"; it offered high school and university courses in addition to sail training on board. The foundation established its own high school, A+ World Academy, the following year.

=== Restorations ===
In keeping with International Maritime Organization (IMO) rules of the 1969 convention that dictate the measurement of vessels of her class, Sørlandet is now 499 gross tons. She is well equipped with air-conditioning but is otherwise in her original condition. The main engine is of 560 HP. In 1980, Sørlandet went through a full restoration. She had extensive repairs in 1988 and again from 2003 to 2007. In the summer of 2012, Sørlandet spent four months in dry-dock at Tuzla, Istanbul, for a major restoration project which included the replacement of many of her riveted steel hull plates, support systems and a complete rebuild of the main ‘Banjer’ area, where students sleep and attend classes. She currently holds class *1A1 E0 in Det Norske Veritas and a worldwide trading certificate for carrying trainees.

== High School (A+ World Academy) ==
In 2015 the Foundation established its own boarding high school, A+ World Academy. The school is a university preparatory secondary school, and classes are taught onboard while the Ship sails to different locations around the world. The school has a capacity of 60-62 students in grades 11 and 12.

In the first two years of the school, they undertook a circumnavigation. The school year started in Kristiansand, Norway in August 2015 and sailed to Hong Kong via Portugal, Morocco, Canary Islands, Cape Verde, Tobago, Curaçao, Colombia, Panama, Galapagos, Easter Island, Tahiti, New Caledonia, Fiji, Indonesia and Singapore. The School year ended in June 2016. The second school year started in Hong Kong August 2016 and sailed to Kristiansand, Norway via Vietnam, Brunei, Indonesia, Christmas Island, Sri Lanka, Maldives, Mauritius, South Africa, Namibia, Saint Helena, Brazil, Dominica, Puerto Rico, USA, Azores, France and the Netherlands.

In the school year 2017/2018 the students are sailing from Kristiansand, Norway to Kristiansand, Norway via the Mediterranean and the Caribbean. The foundation oversees the A+ World Academy from its offices in Kristiansand.

=== Curriculum ===
Students follow an academic program based on Advanced Placement courses and may study subjects such as mathematics, calculus, physics, chemistry, biology, English, Spanish, politics, economics and history.

=== Life at the school ===
Students at the school take an active part in the day-to-day operation of the Ship alongside their classes. They are each assigned to one of six watches which each cover 2 hrs of the night and 2 hrs of the day. Tasks that they perform during watch include cleaning, maintenance, sail maneuvering, helming, lookout, galley and safety rounds. Life at the school can be a complex, students learn to manage their time between learning, watch, rest, personal downtime, and social free time.

== Participation in Regattas ==
The Sørlandet has participated in several Tall Ships’ Races, and her merit list is as follows:

- 1956 Turbay-Lisboa (2nd place)
- 1960 Oslo-Ostende (2nd place)
- 1962 Turbay Bretagnekysten-Rotterdam (2nd place)
- 1964 Lisboa-Bermuda (4th place)
- 1966 Falmouth-Skagen (1st place)
- 1968 Gøteborg-"Ocean Viking"-Kristiansand (2nd place)
- 1980 Skagen-Amsterdam (4th place)
- 2003 Riga - Travemünde (1st place)
- 2004 Stavanger - Cuxhaven (4th place)
- 2005 Newcastle Gateshead - Fredrikstad (5th place)
- 2015 Belfast-Aalesund (2nd place), Kristiansand - Aalborg (1st place)
- 2018 Sunderland - Esbjerg (2nd place)
- 2018 Stavanger - Harlingen (3rd place)

== Technical data ==
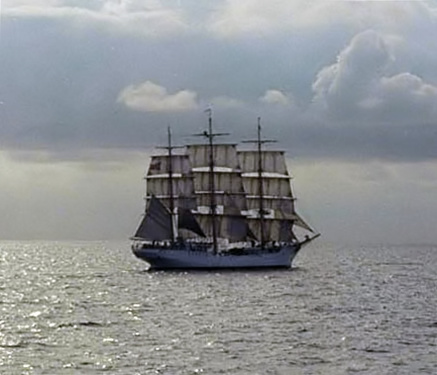
Sørlandet sailing

- Displacement: 891 tons
- Tonnage: 499 gross tons
- Length: 56.69m/186’
- Length inclusive bowsprit: 64.15m/210.5’
- Height of mast head : 35m (115’) above sea level
- Decks: 2
- Bulkheads: 4
- Draft: 4-45m /14.5’
- Beam: 8.87m/28.1’
- Trainee capacity: 70/sailing or 150 passengers in closed waters. 60-62 students during the school year
- Fixed crew: 15
- Propulsion: Deutz Diesel 564 BHP
- Auxiliary Power: 560KW / 9 knots
- Number of Sails: 27
- Sail Area: 1,240m² (10,360 square feet)
- Area of trainees’ quarter (banjer): Approx. 200m²
