= Jakt =

Single-masted, fast sailing boat

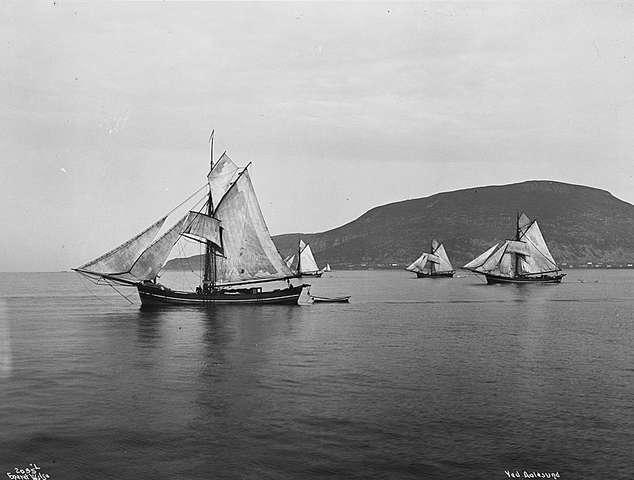
Jakts in a close formation

A jakt is a small, single-masted, fast sailing boat, with a wide and flat hull, probably of Dutch origin. Jakts had split booms, with a crab mainsail and two or three jibs. They were also commonly equipped with a breifokk, a kind of jib.

== Etymology ==
The term jakt has its origin in the Dutch expression jacht or jachtschip, which refers to a fast sailing ship. The word is also the origin of the English term yacht, although this term describes a completely different type of boat – a large pleasure craft.

== Description ==
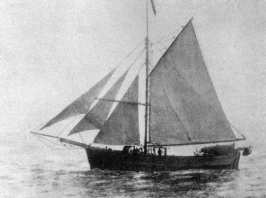
Gjøa, a Hardanger jakt that served as Roald Amundsen's first vessel to the South Pole

Jakts were primarily built as cargo ships for fjords and nearby coastal areas, but larger, later-built jakts could also be used to sail across the Atlantic Ocean. This type of ship was built based on the experiences and ideas of the various shipbuilders about the construction details that offered the best properties of use.

== Galley-type jakt ==
A later development of the design was the jaktegaleas, also known as a galley-type jakt. Compared to a conventional jakt, jaktegaleas often have one stern mast (a mizzen), which is lower and larger than the forward mast. This arrangement was advantageous as it had a lower crew requirement compared to the conventional design while being larger in size.

== Hardangerjakt ==
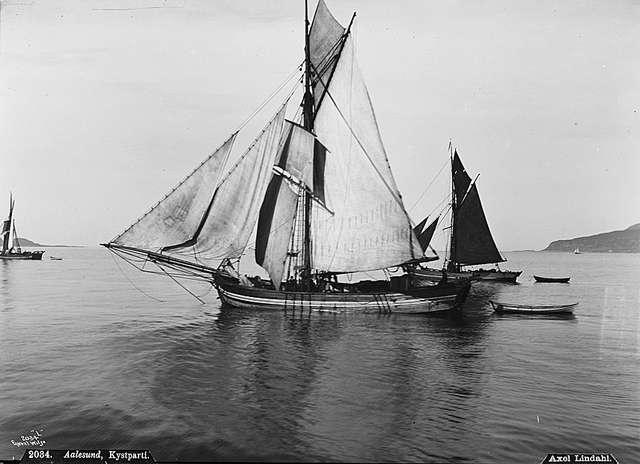
Photo by Axel Theodor Lindahl of a Hardangerjakt in Vigrafjorden, near Ålesund

A Hardangerjakt is a single-masted sailboat, with a flat hull and a round transom, rigged with a crab mainsail and jib. It was a popular type of boat at the end of the 19th century. The jakt was used mainly as a cargo ship in coastal shipping, especially for transporting salted fish from Northern Norway to Western Norway.

Anna af Sand is the oldest ship still afloat in Europe, launched in 1848, preserved as a typical example of a Hardangerjakt. The ship is owned by the Stavanger Maritime Museum.

== See also ==
- Anna Kristina - A Hardangerjakt currently a museum ship

== Bibliography ==
- Delius, Klasing + Co (1985): Maritime Encyclopedia: A Maritime Handbook ISBN 82-512-0150-0
