= Anna af Sand =

One of the oldest sailing cargo ships still in use in Europe

History

Norway
- Name: Anna af Sand
- Namesake: Anna, wife of Torger Bjørnsen Marvik
- Owner: Stavanger Maritime Museum
- Builder: Unknown
- Launched: 1854
- Acquired: 1973 (by Stavanger Maritime Museum)
- Fate: Preserved and actively sailed
- Notes: Built originally as Haabet

General characteristics
- Type: Hardangerjakt
- Length: 15.8 m (52 ft)
- Beam: 5.5 m (18 ft)
- Draught: 2.2 m (7.2 ft)
- Propulsion: Sail
- Sail plan: Gaff rigged with five sails
- Armament: None
- Notes: One of Europe’s oldest still-sailing cargo vessels

Anna af Sand is a Hardangerjakt built in 1854, and one of the oldest wooden sailing cargo ships in Europe still in operation. As of 2023, the vessel is owned and maintained by the Stavanger Museum in Norway.

== Commercial service ==
Anna af Sand was originally launched as Haabet in Hardanger, Norway, in 1854, and was used as a coastal cargo vessel. From about 1864 it was based in the Ryfylke district.

In 1896, after nearly 50 years of service, the vessel was pulled ashore for a major overhaul. The hull and rigging were extensively rebuilt under the ownership of Torger Bjørnsen Marvik, who renamed the ship after his wife, Anna. In 1899, the vessel was sold to Bjødne and Thore Rørvik Eide in the village of Sand, and from then on it was known as Anna af Sand. It was traded by the Eide family in the Ryfylke district for more than 70 years, as well as supporting the herring fishery as accommodation vessel and carrying fish to Baltic ports. In 1924 Anna af Strand was fitted with an auxiliary engine (replaced in 1952) as well as an enclosed wheelhouse, while continuing to utilise its sails.

== Museum ship ==
After the end of Anna af Sand's trading life, it was purchased by English buyers in 1968, but wrecked at Kvitsøy, near Stavanger, as they attempted to cross the North Sea. Towed back into Stavanger, the vessel came to the notice of Norwegian shipowner Torolf Smedvig, who recognized its cultural significance and purchased it with the aim of preserving it. In 1973, with the restoration back to its original form complete, he donated the ship to the Stavanger Maritime Museum.

Since then, Anna af Sand has been officially recognized as a heritage vessel in Norway, being used for official and cultural missions. She is a representative of the sail-powered cargo ships that were once essential to the economy of Norway's coastal communities. Since at least 1982, Anna af Sand has made voyages abroad to promote Norwegian maritime culture and history. That year the vessel called at Fraserburgh and other British ports en route to participate in the 1982 tall ships gathering at Brest, France, and in 1987 was in Aberdeen to support proposals for closer cultural co-operation between that city and Stavanger.

In the 1990 the ship made a notable voyage to the Baltic with a symbolic herring cargo, calling at ports in Poland, the Baltic States and Russia, retracing the traditional voyages from earlier in the century, including ports that had not received a visit of a western ship for over 50 years. In 1995 Anna af Sand carried a consignment of traditional Norwegian klippfisk to northern Spain, returning from San Sebastián with salt and wine.

In 2025, Anna af Sand was one of the participating tall ships at 2025 SAIL Amsterdam, where she was noted as the smallest but oldest among the international fleet.

== See also ==
- Stavanger Museum
- Hardangerjakt
- Sail Amsterdam
