= STS Sedov =

4-masted steel sailing ship, launched 1921

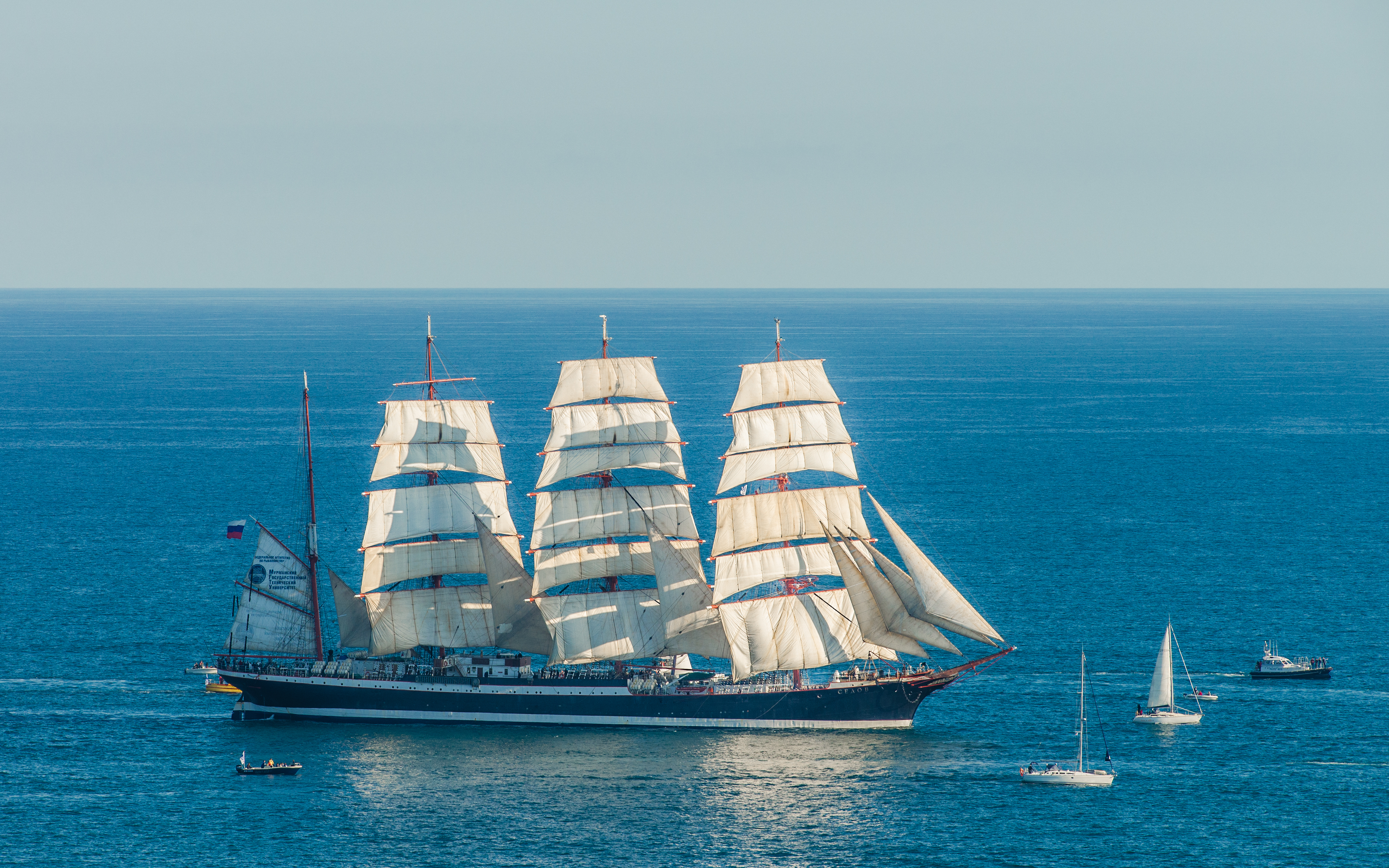
- Sedov

History

Germany
- Name: Magdalene Vinnen II (1921–1936); Kommodore Johnsen (1938–1948)
- Ordered: 1919
- Builder: Friedrich Krupp Germaniawerft, Kiel, Germany
- Laid down: 1920
- Launched: 23 March 1921
- Commissioned: 1921
- Fate: Acquired in 1945 by the Soviet Union as a war reparation

Russia
- Name: Sedov
- Acquired: 1945
- Identification: IMO number: 7946356; Call sign: UELO; MMSI number: 273510000
- Fate: Active as a training ship

General characteristics
- Type: Barque
- Tonnage: 3,500 GRT standard
- Displacement: 7,300 long tons (7,400 t) (at 5,350 ts load)
- Length: 117.5 m (385 ft 6 in) oa.; Hull:108.7 m (356 ft 8 in); Deck:100 m (328 ft 1 in)
- Beam: 14.6 m (47 ft 11 in)
- Height: 54 m (177 ft 2 in)
- Draft: 6.7 m (22 ft 0 in)
- Propulsion: Auxiliary diesel
- Sail plan: Sail area: 4,195 m^{2} (45,150 sq ft)
- Speed: 18 kn (33 km/h; 21 mph) max; 10 kn (19 km/h; 12 mph) under engine
- Complement: 220 (Professional crew: 60; Cadets: 120;)

STS Sedov (Russian: Седов), formerly Magdalene Vinnen II (1921–1936) and Kommodore Johnsen (–1948), is a four-masted steel barque that for almost 80 years was the largest traditional sailing ship in operation. Originally built as a German cargo ship, Sedov is today a sail training vessel, training cadets from the universities of Kaliningrad, Saint Petersburg and Astrakhan. She participates regularly in the big maritime international events as a privileged host and has also been a regular participant in The Tall Ships' Races.

== History ==
=== Magdalene Vinnen II ===
Sedov, originally named Magdalene Vinnen II, was launched at Kiel, Germany in 1921 by the Friedrich Krupp Germaniawerft for the shipping company F. A. Vinnen & Co. of Bremen, one of the largest German shipping companies at the beginning of the 20th century. The shipping company initially objected to have an engine installed in the ship, but the ship yard (with backing from a Government committee) successfully argued for an engine, making the ship the first sailing ship with auxiliary engine designed to modern principles.

Magdalene Vinnen II was at the time the world’s largest auxiliary barque and exclusively used as a cargo ship with a crew that was partially made up of cadets. She sailed on her maiden voyage on 1 September 1921. Until her last voyage as Magdalene Vinnen II in 1936, the ship sailed to Argentina, South Africa, Australia, Reunion and the Seychelles.

=== Kommodore Johnsen ===
On 9 August 1936, Magdalene Vinnen II was sold to Norddeutscher Lloyd of Bremen and renamed Kommodore Johnsen. The new owner modified her to a cargo-carrying training ship.

=== Sedov ===
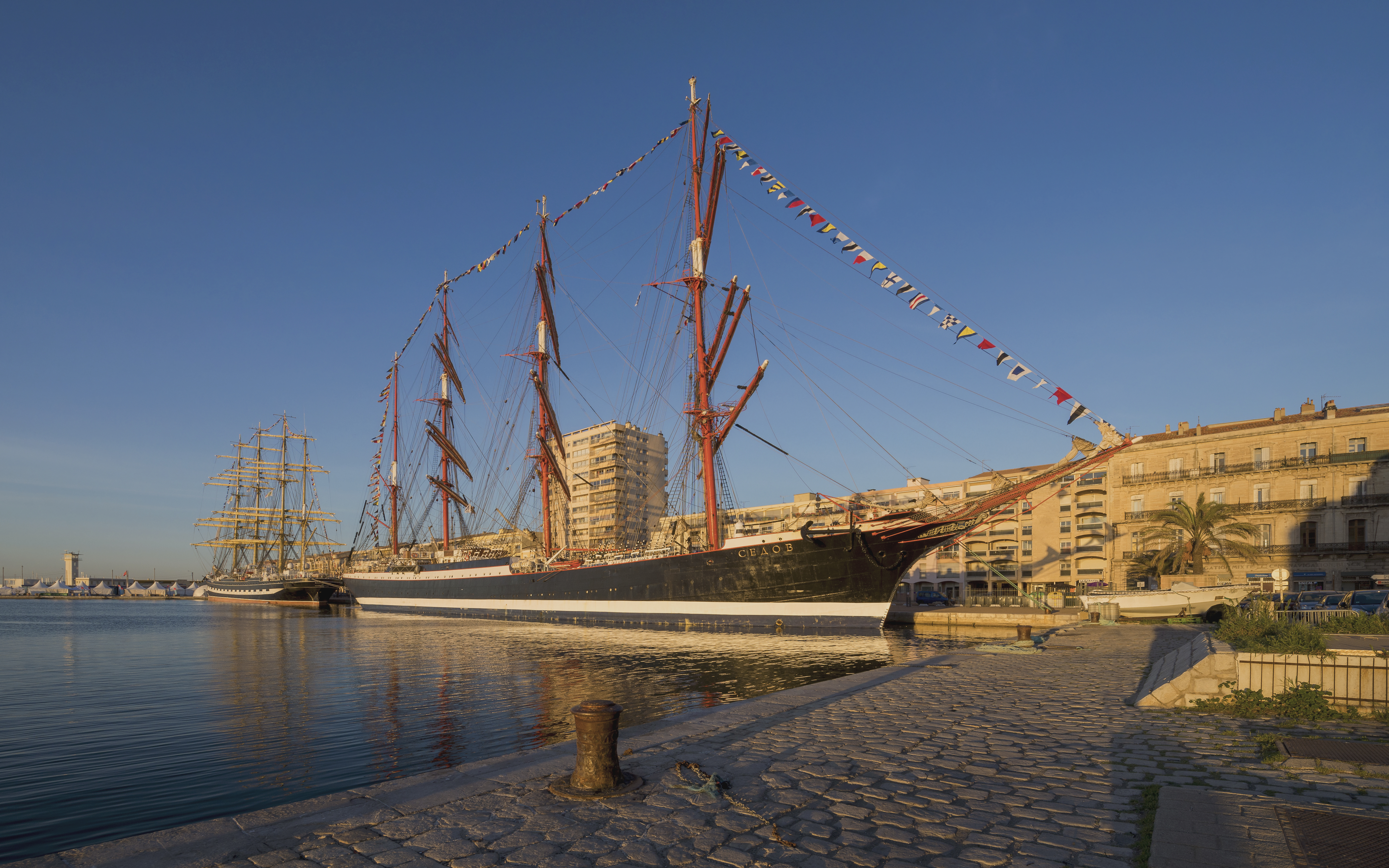
Sedov and Kruzenshtern in Sète, France.

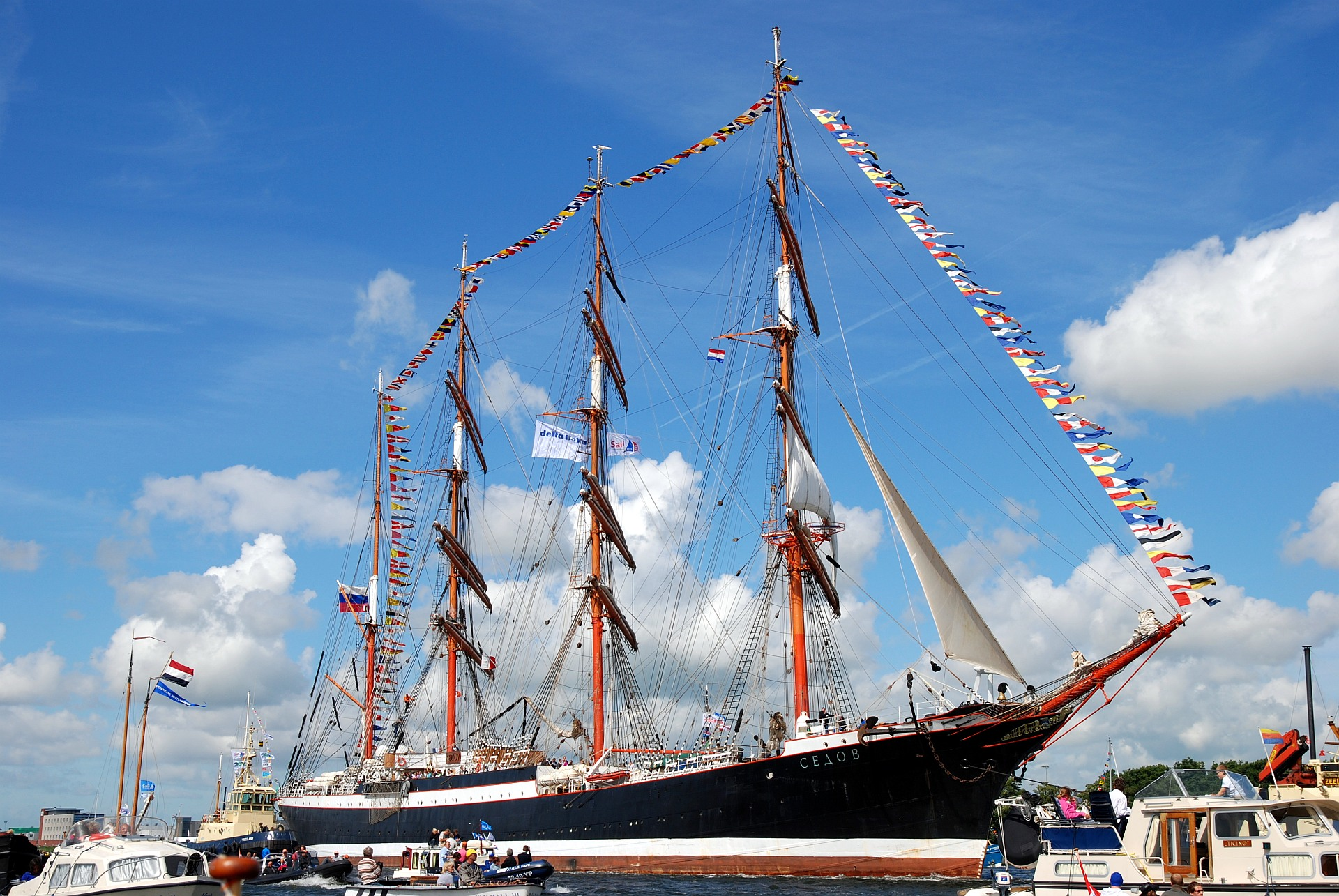
Sedov on the North Sea Canal during SAIL Amsterdam 2010

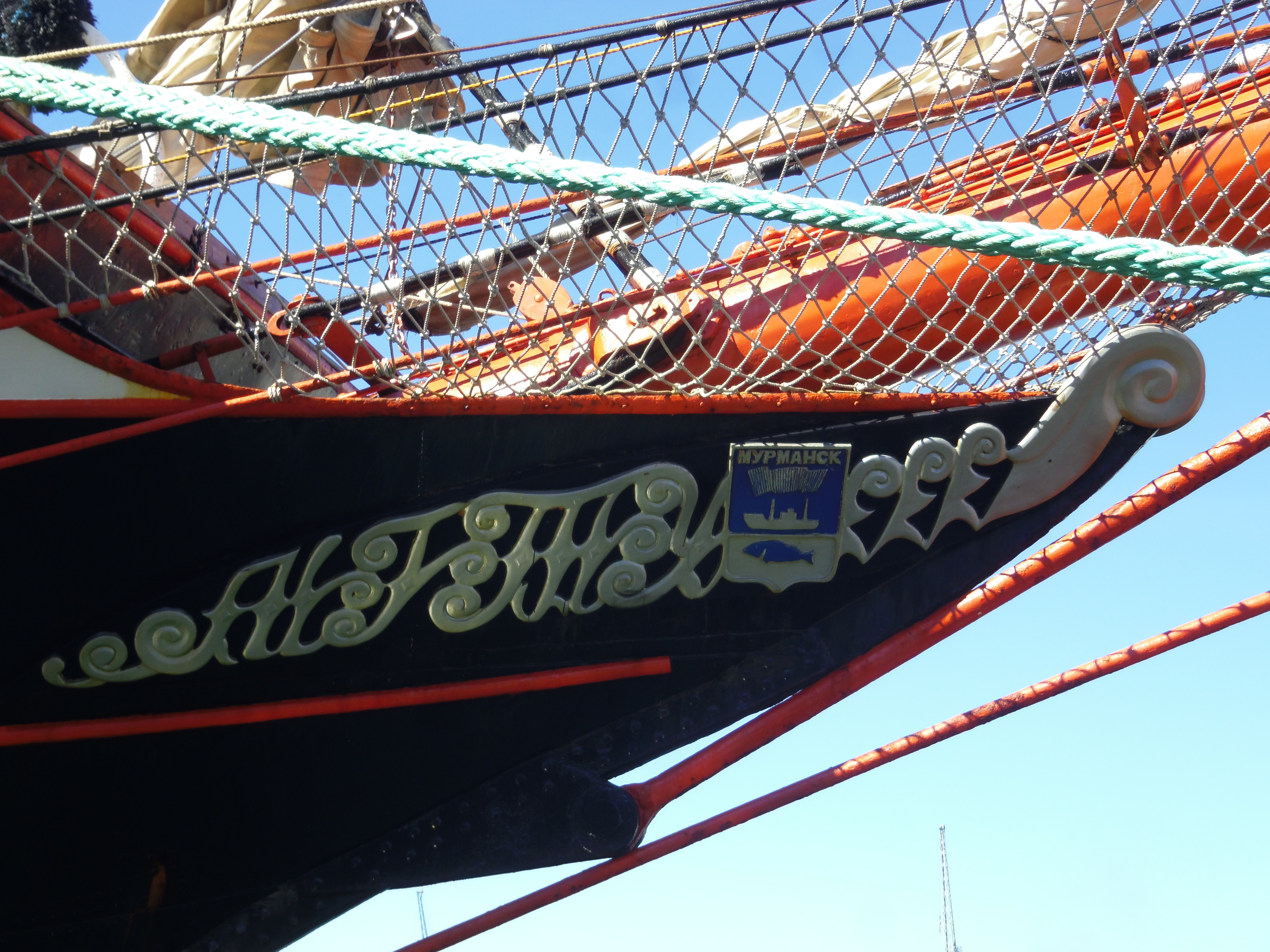
The prow of STS Sedov, showing the Murmansk shield and scroll work. Taken during April 2013 visit to Cape Town, South Africa on Sedov's round the world trip.

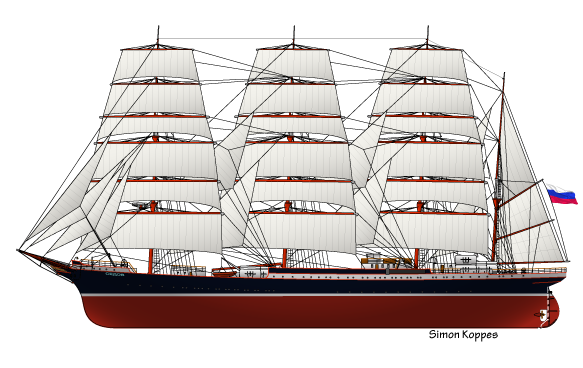
Line art of Sedov

She came under Russian state ownership after the surrender of Germany — on 20 December 1945, the British handed over the ship to the Soviet Union as war reparation. In the Soviet Union, she was converted into a sail training vessel of the Soviet Navy. Renamed Sedov after the Arctic explorer Georgy Sedov who died during an investigation in the Arctic in 1914, she was used as a training ship of the Navy from 1952 to 1957. From 1957 to 1966 she was used as an oceanographic research ship in the North Atlantic. In 1966 when she was transferred to the reserve in Kronstadt, formally under the civil ownership of the Ministry of Fisheries.

In 1981, Sedov reappeared after renovation. Based at the Baltic Division of Training Ships in Riga she embarked cadets from schools of navigation of Kaliningrad and Murmansk. After the declaration of independence of Latvia in 1991, she left Riga for Murmansk, transferred to the Murmansk naval school with the city of Murmansk ensuring her management and maintenance.

On 20 June 2013, Sedov was in collision with the Kraweel Lisa von Lübeck off Texel, North Holland, Netherlands. Both vessels put into Den Helder.

Sedov has regularly been targeted by unpaid creditors of the Russian Federation such as Nessim Gaon (of now defunct Swiss group NOGA, an anagram of Gaon) and also by French holders of defaulted Russian bonds; in 2002 Sedov was forced to precipitously and unexpectedly leave Marseille in the dead of night to avoid being served a writ by AFPER (French association of holders of Russian Empire bonds) the following morning.

For over a year French holders of defaulted Russian bonds were warning they were going to reorganize and export their claim to Anglo-Saxon jurisdictions, more friendly to private citizens than the French.

In May 2008, in the wake of British-Russian tension, Sedov was instructed by Moscow not to dock as planned at Southend-on-Sea. The September 2008 visit to Falmouth, the starting point of FUNCHAL 500 race to Madeira, also seemed to be in jeopardy.

In 2011 Sedov celebrated her 90th anniversary. In 2012 Sedov started her first voyage around the world of more than 13 months. The voyage ended on 20 July 2013 at Saint Petersburg, Russia.

In 2017, Sedov changed her home port to Kaliningrad and she is managed by the Kaliningrad State Technical University.

== See also ==
- List of large sailing vessels
- Windjammer

== Sources ==
- Official website
- Tall ship Sedov Murmansk State Technical University.
- Sedov in The Tall Ships Blog
- Барк "Седов" во Владивостоке_2013. on YouTube
