= Axel Lindahl =

Axel Lindahl may refer to:

- Axel Lindahl (photographer)
- Axel Lindahl (athlete)
- Axel Lindahl (footballer)
