= SAIL Amsterdam =

Maritime event in Amsterdam, Netherlands

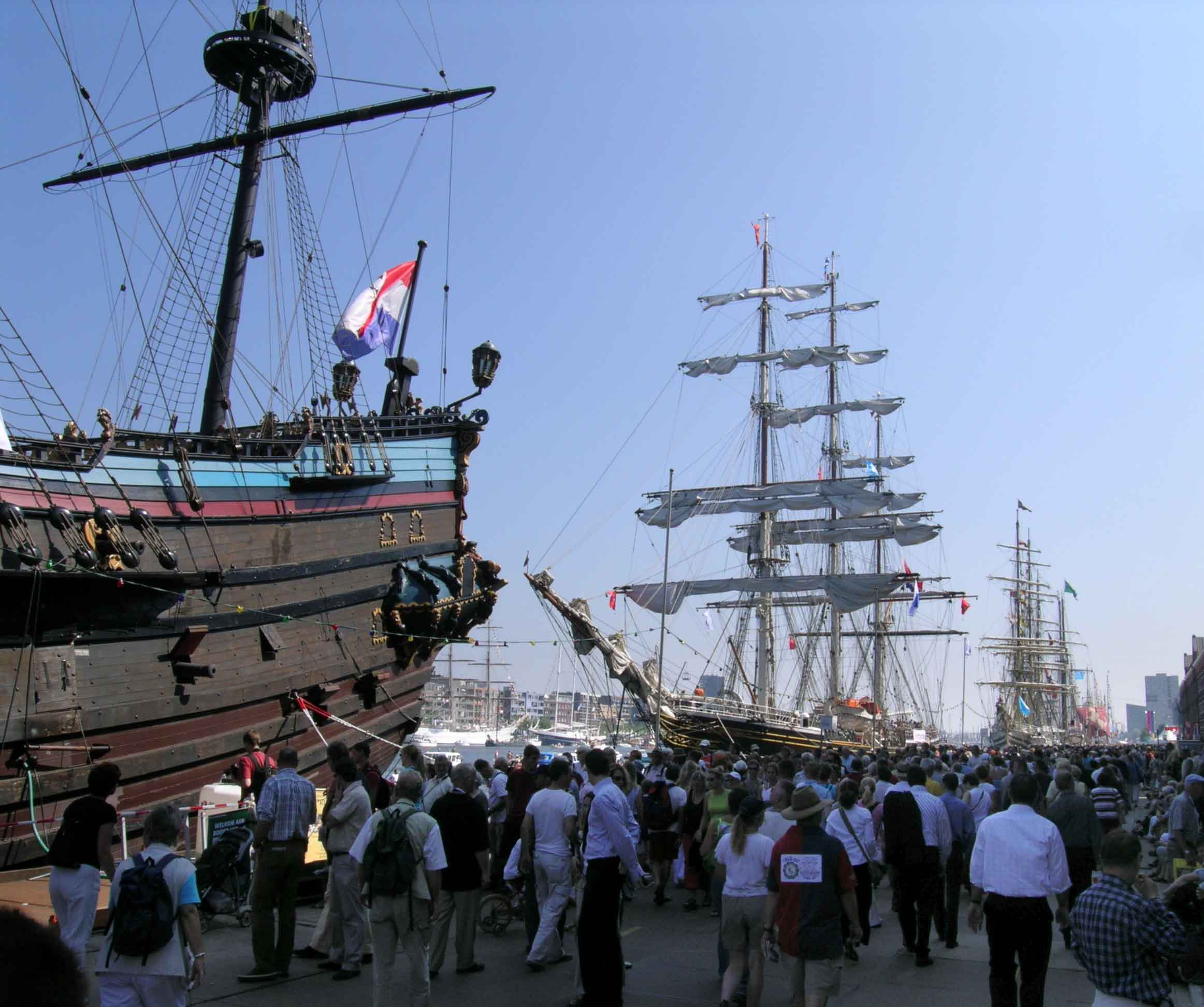
SAIL Amsterdam in 2005

SAIL Amsterdam is a maritime event held once every five years in Amsterdam in the Netherlands. Tall ships from all over the world visit the city to moor in its eastern harbour. The 2020 event was cancelled due to the COVID-19 pandemic.

== History ==
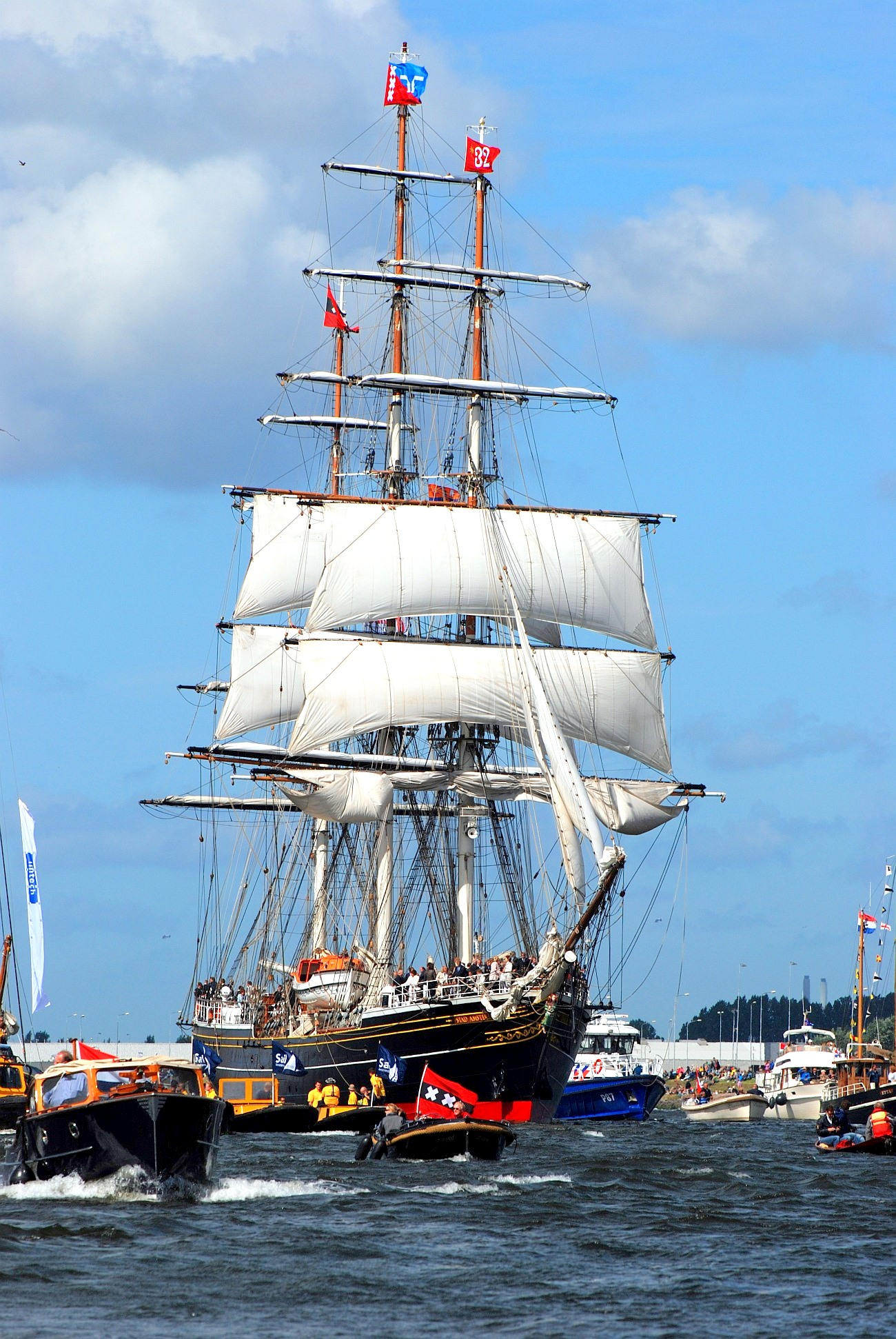
The Stad Amsterdam, the flagship of SAIL Amsterdam 2010

The event was organised in 1975 to celebrate the 700th anniversary of Amsterdam, under the name 'Sail Amsterdam 700'. This led to the establishment of the Stichting Sail Amsterdam (SSA, Foundation Sail Amsterdam).

=== 1975 ===
More than 850 ships from 21 countries participated in the inaugural SAIL Amsterdam. The tjalk Stockpaerdt participated in the event on inception.

=== 1980 ===
SAIL Amsterdam 1980 had approximately 1,000 sailing ships from multiple countries. Participants included the Soviet Union's Kruzenshtern, Poland's Dar Pomorza, Sea Cloud from the Bahamas, Germany's Gorch Fock, and the Sir Winston Churchill.

=== 1985 ===
The Netherlands commemorated SAIL Amsterdam 1985 with an issue of three stamps.

=== 1990 ===
SAIL Amsterdam 1990 opened on 9 August. During the 1990 event, a limited number of visitors were permitted to stay onboard some of the sailing vessels.

=== 1995 ===
SAIL Amsterdam 1995 took place from 10 to 14 August. As many as 3 million attendees were expected.

=== 2000 ===
The Stad Amsterdam, a 250-foot, three-masted clipper ship, was christened during SAIL Amsterdam 2000.

=== 2005 ===
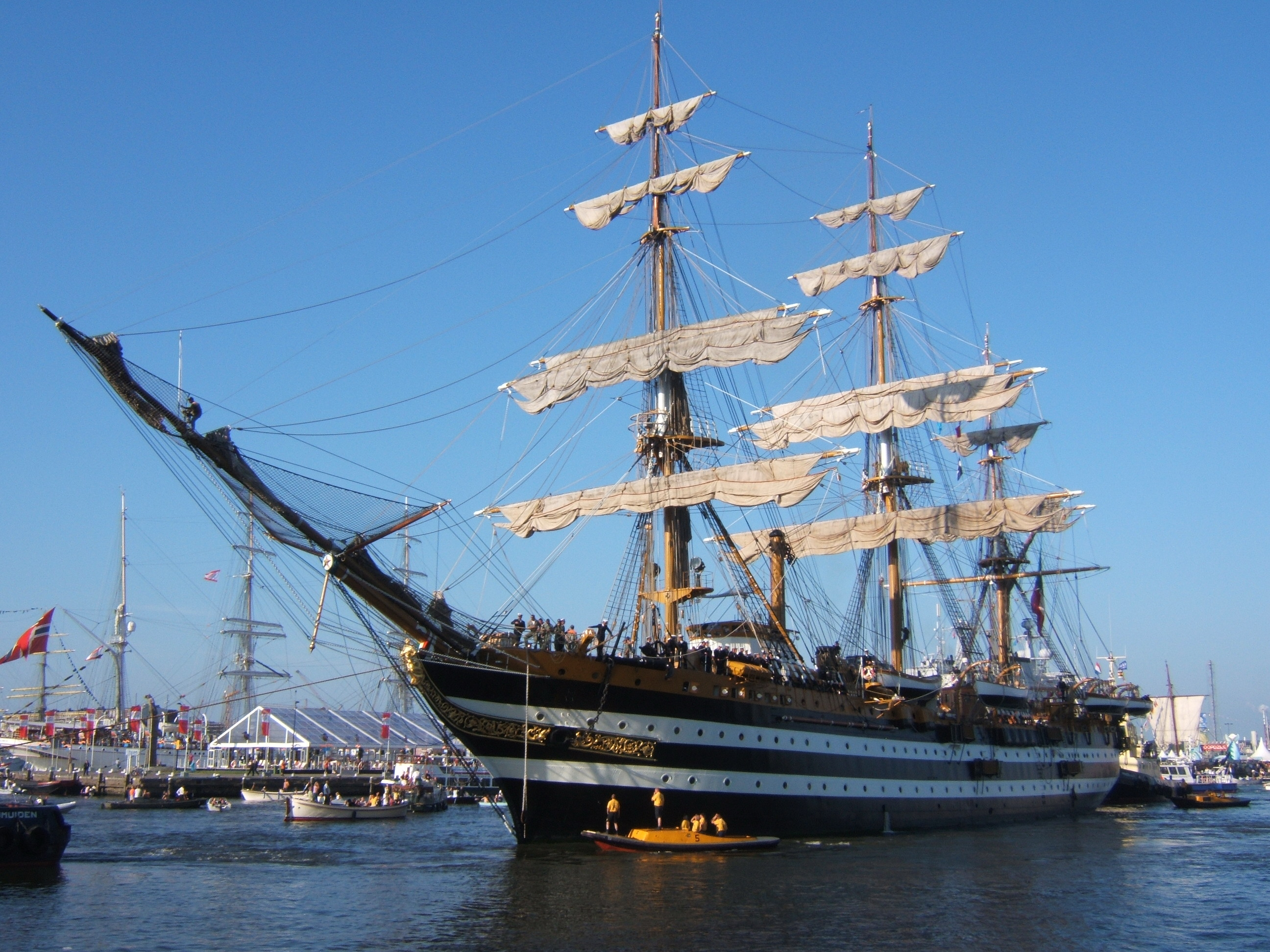
The Amerigo Vespucci during Sail 2005

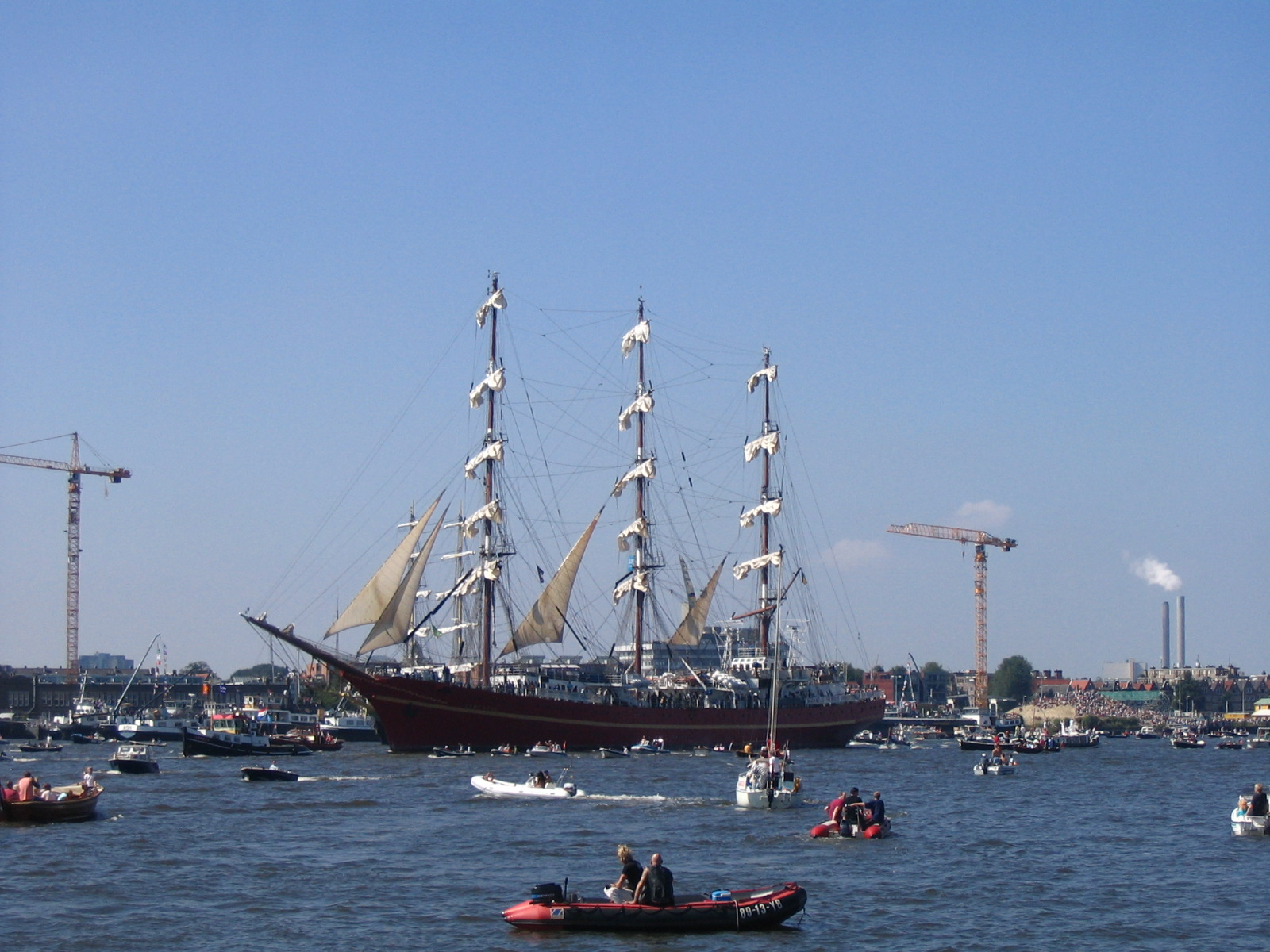
Chaos on the water during the Sail-in of 2005

SAIL Amsterdam 2005 was held from 17 to 22 August, the 7th occurrence of the festival. The event was expected to attract 2 to 3 million visitors. The official number of tall ships which participated was 21 but in total over 50 ships with at least 3 masts were present. There were also several ship replicas, hundreds of classical sail- and steamships and some modern marine ships. For the first time several modern yachts and a submarine were present.

The tall ships were moored in the IJhaven (IJ harbour) and in Amsterdam North (across 't IJ) and the Varend Erfgoed boats were moored in the Oosterdok nearby, where one can also find the Nederlands Scheepvaartmuseum (a maritime museum) with its replica of a Dutch East India Company (VOC) ship, which is permanently moored there.

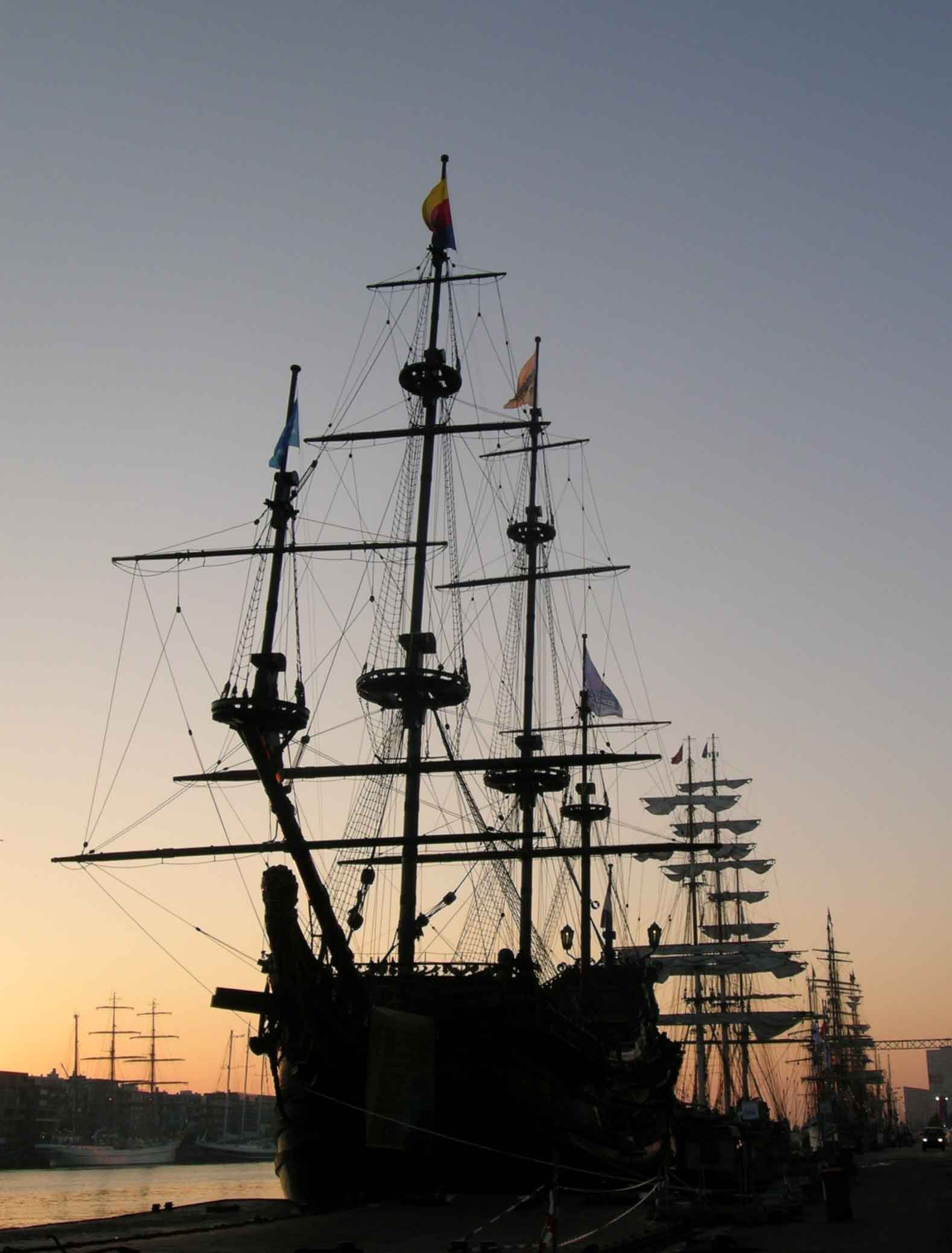
Early morning overview of tall ships

The main ships, in the order of the official walking-route were (with length and nation of origin):

- STS Sedov (117m, Russia) (arrived later, on Friday)
- Tenacious (65 m, Great Britain)
- Amerigo Vespucci (104 m, Italy)
- Mir (109 m, Russia)
- Kruzenshtern (114 m, Russia)
- Prins Willem (the Netherlands) (a replica)
- Stad Amsterdam (76 m, the Netherlands) (the Flagship)
- Sørlandet (64 m, Norway)
- Europa (55 m, the Netherlands)
- Oosterschelde (50 m, the Netherlands)
- Eendracht (59 m, the Netherlands)
- Sagres (89 m, Portugal)
- Swan fan Makkum (62m, Netherlands)
- Alexander von Humboldt (63 m, Germany)
- Khersones (110 m, Ukraine)
- Pogoria (49 m, Poland)
- Shabab Oman (52m, Oman)
- Dar Młodzieży (110 m, Poland)
- Kamper Kogge (Netherlands) (a replica of the kogge, a popular type of ship in the Netherlands in the Middle Ages)
- Statsraad Lehmkuhl (98 m, Norway)
- Mircea (81 m, Romania)
- Dewaruci (63 m, Indonesia)
- Tarangini (54 m, India)
- Kaliakra (52m, Bulgaria)

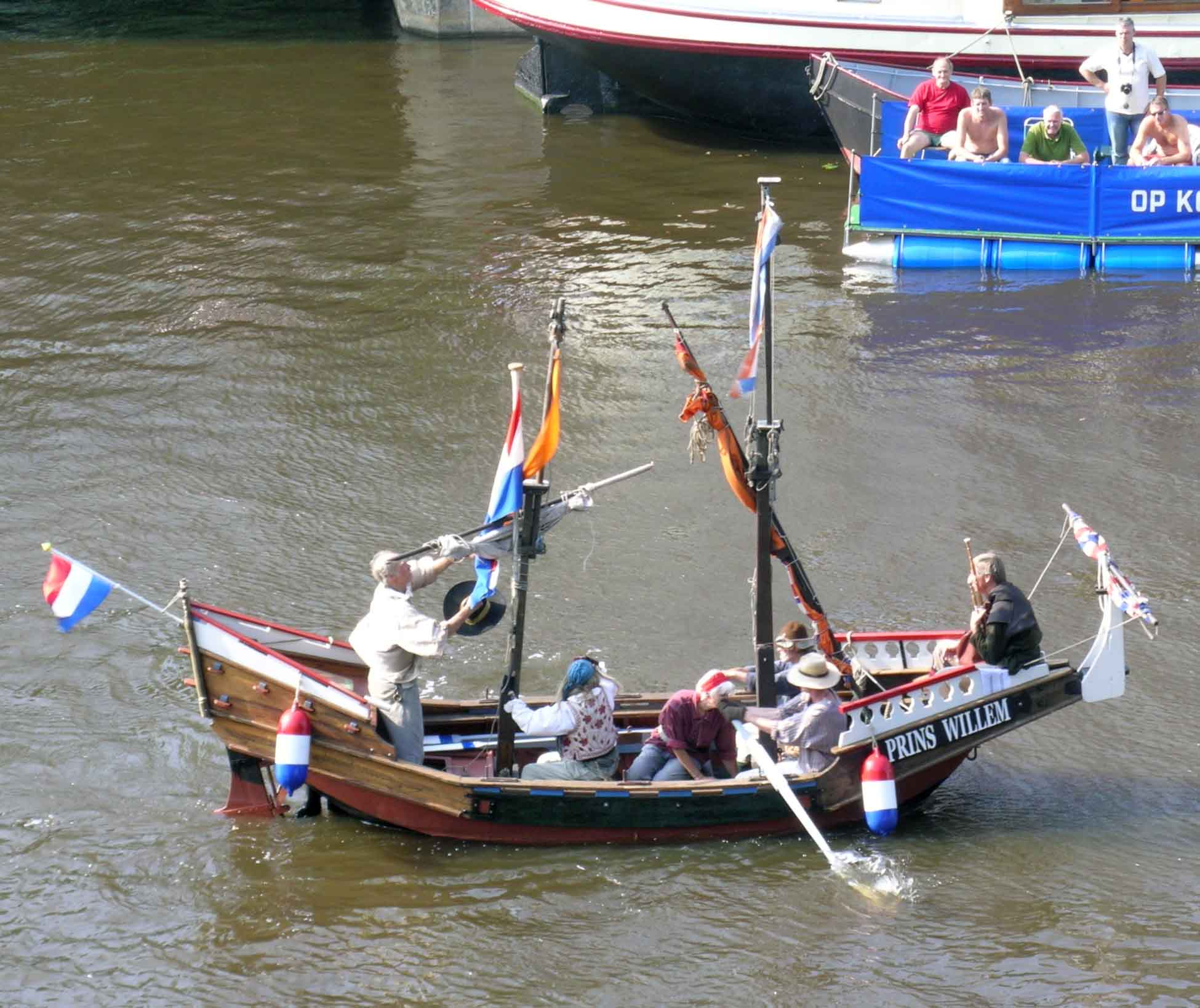
A so-called 'Pieremachochel', the Prins Willem

Smaller events included an exposition of yacht building and a parade of carnavalesque floating creations.

The event cost around €7.5 million to stage which was financed by sponsorship and trading activity.

On the first day, the ships gather in the locks at IJmuiden for the Sail In or Parade of Sail through the North Sea Canal to Amsterdam, led by the event's flagship. In 2005 that was the Stad Amsterdam, which was supposed to reach Amsterdam first, but she ran aground with the Dutch crown prince Willem Alexander aboard and the Statsraad Lehmkuhl then preceded her.

=== 2010 ===
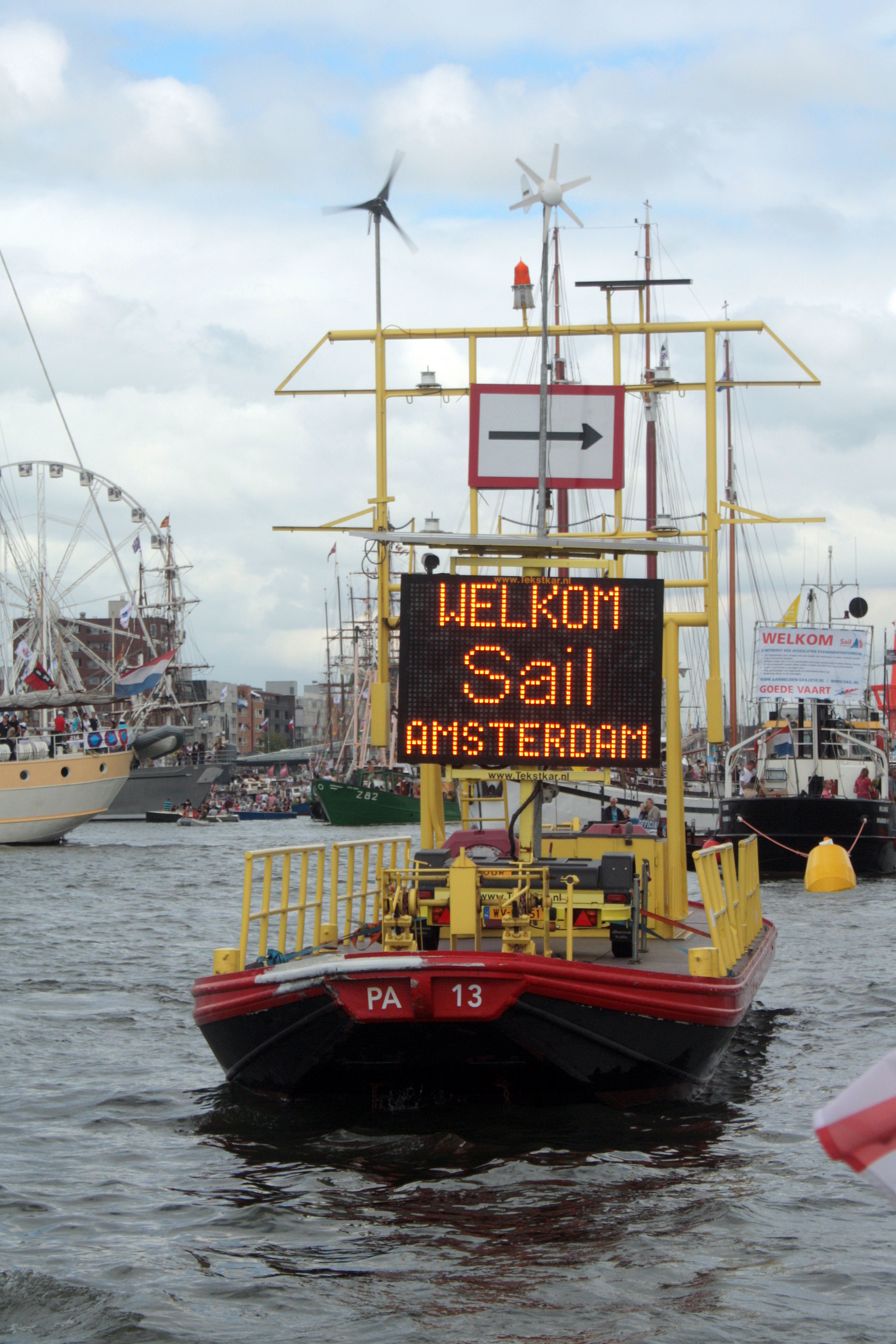
Welcome to Sail Amsterdam

SAIL Amsterdam 2010 was held from 19 August until 23 August that year.

=== 2015 ===
SAIL Amsterdam 2015 was held from 19 to 23 August 2015.

- List of sailing ships participating in Sail Amsterdam 2015

=== 2020 ===
SAIL Amsterdam was scheduled to be he held from 12 to 16 August 2020, but was cancelled after the Dutch government banned organized events until 1 September 2020 due to the COVID-19 pandemic. The organization decided it was unrealistic to postpone the event, as it was impossible to say if such a mass event could be organised safely in 2021.

=== 2025 ===
2025 SAIL Amsterdam was the tenth edition, and the first one since 2015 as the 2020 event was cancelled. It was one of the main events celebrating Amsterdam's 750th. It has also been 50 years since the first SAIL Amsterdam was held. The event was held 20 - 24 August.

== See also ==
- List of large sailing vessels
