= Druzhba (ship) =

Three-masted training ship

Coordinates: 46°29′44.7″N 30°44′13.9″E

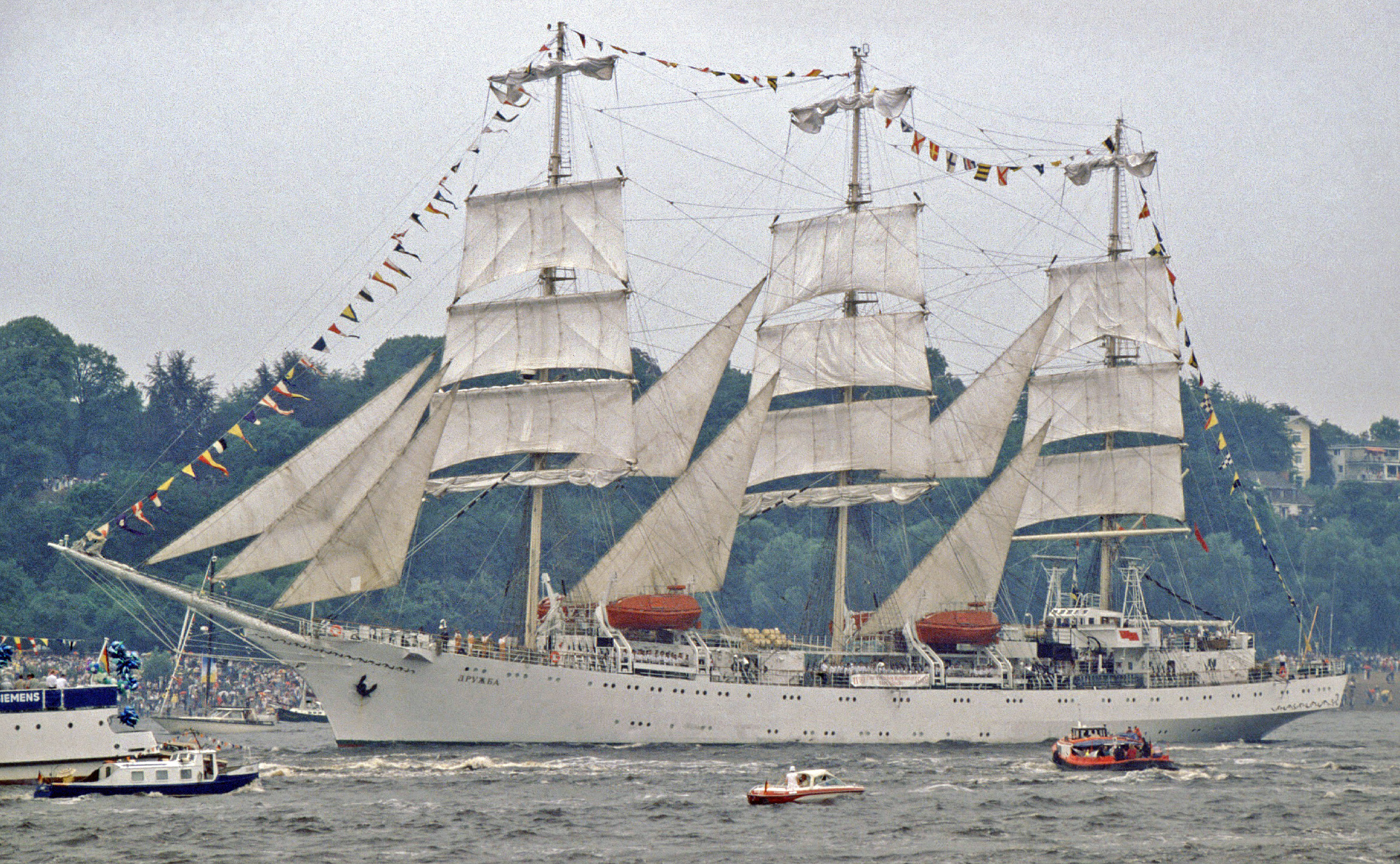
- Druzhba in Hamburg, 1989

History

→ Soviet Union → Ukraine
- Name: Druzhba
- Port of registry: Odessa, Ukraine
- Builder: Vladimir Lenin Shipyard, Poland
- Launched: 1987
- Status: Laid up

Druzhba (Russian: Дружба, lit. 'Friendship') is a three-masted, full-rigged training ship, based in Odesa, Ukraine. It was built in 1987 at the Vladimir Lenin Shipyard in Gdańsk, Poland. The vessel is one of six sister ships designed by the Polish naval architect Zygmunt Choreń, alongside Dar Młodzieży, Mir, Pallada, Khersones and Nadezhda.

== Service history ==
In 1997, Druzhba was leased to the tourism firm "Primoyre", owned by Leonid Klimov.

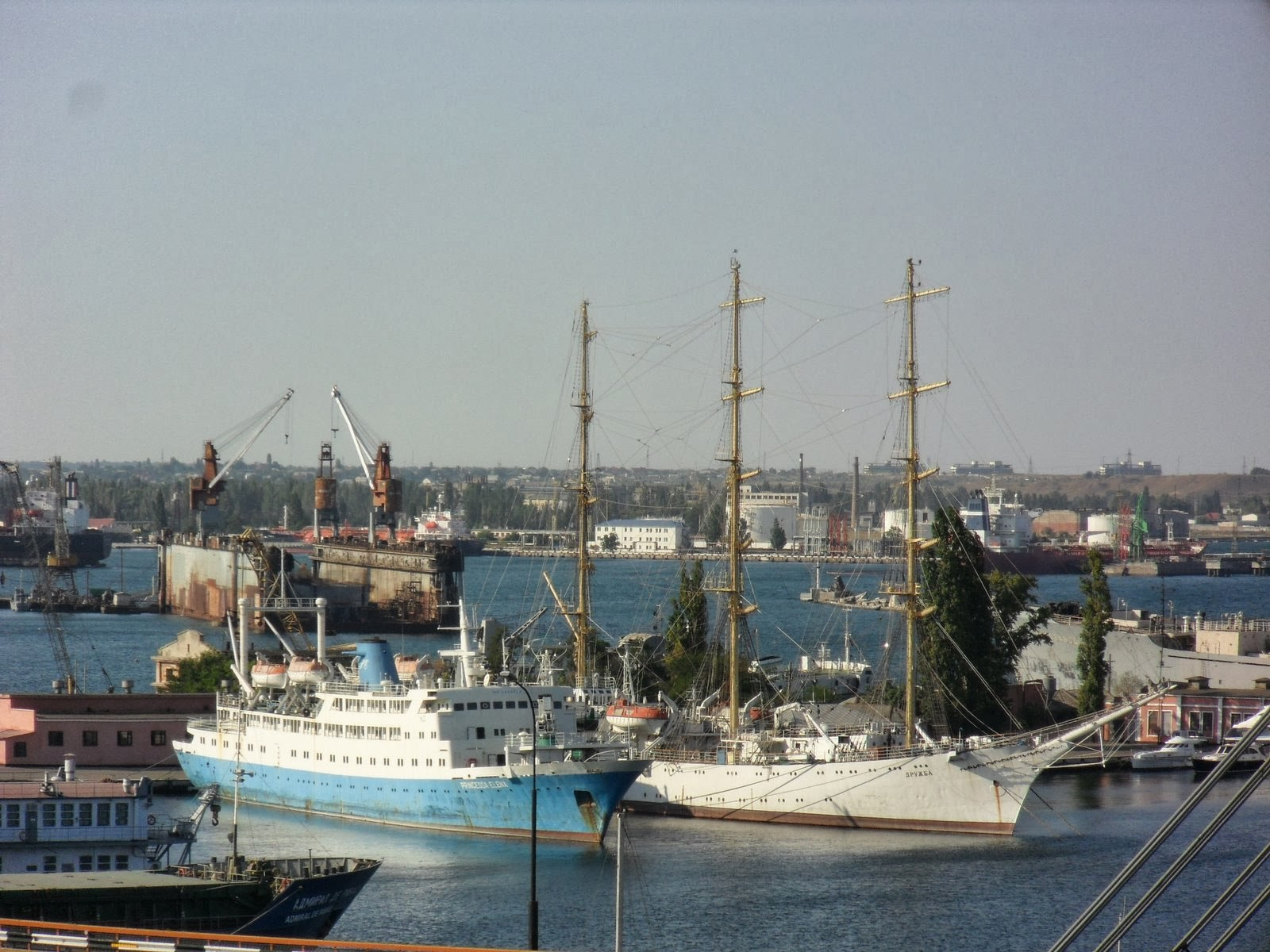
Druzhba laid up in the Port of Odesa.

In February 2001, Druzhba departed Limassol bound for Odessa. With its operating company bankrupt, the ship was laid up in Practical Harbour. Since this time, the vessel has remained in a non seaworthy state, but is sporadically used as a shore-based training ship.

In 2013, it was proposed that restoration work would take place in Sevastopol. However, this did not take place as a result of the Maidan Revolution, Russian annexation of Crimea and general breakdown of Russia-Ukraine relations. The sister ship Khersones, also in a state of semi-abandonment, was seized by Russia. In 2015, Khersones was restored to seaworthy conditions, and was put back into service in 2016.

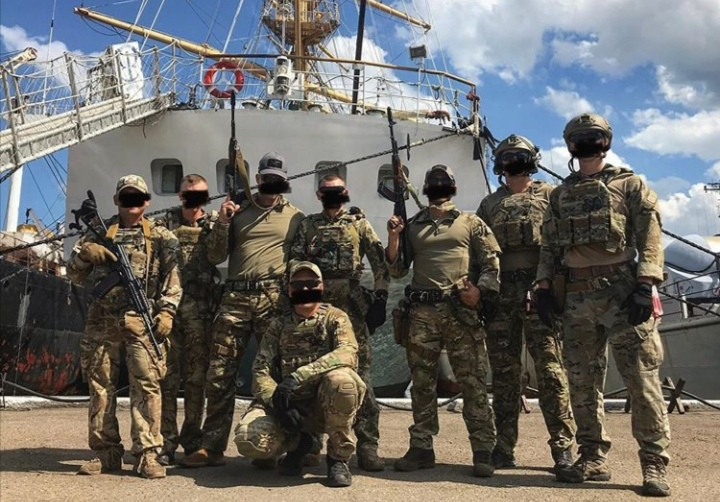
801 PDSS of the Ukrainian Navy training aboard Druzhba.

In October 2021, during a visit by the President of Ukraine Volodymyr Zelensky, it was stated that the ship would be restored and transferred to the Naval Forces of the Odesa Maritime Academy for the Ukrainian Navy. By this year, the condition of the ship had deteriorated significantly, with missing documentation, rotten sails and worn out masts, spars, rigging and decking. Due to the loss of operational training capability provided by Druzhba, the Odesa Maritime Academy no longer provides practical seagoing training.

In December 2023 the Lviv City Council allocated 20 million UAH towards the restoration of Druzhba, on the request of the Institute of Naval Forces of the Odesa Maritime Academy. Although the funding was initially rejected, it was pushed through under reasons of national security by Andriy Sadovyi, the mayor of Lviv. In particular, funding was allocated towards the restoration of sails and navigational equipment. However, in 2024, Lviv City Council deputy Nataliya Shelestak raised alarms that the money had gone missing, with no transparency on how it was spent. It was later claimed that the money had been redirected by the navy towards the purchase of FPV drones and night vision devices.

On 25 May 2026, Druzhba was reportedly damaged in an explosion while laid up at Practical Harbour in the Port of Odessa. Dmytro Pletenchuk, a spokesman for the Ukrainian Navy claimed that an explosive device had been detonated, but there were no casualties or damage to port infrastructure. The amount of damage the ship sustained was not clarified. It was later reported that a Russian Orlan-10 reconnaissance drone had been overflying the vessel at the time.

== In popular culture ==
Druzhba features in the 1987 Soviet television documentary "Sails of Friendship".

In 2021, The Maritime Telegraph, an Odessa based maritime news site, produced the documentary "Saving Druzhba", highlighting history as well as present poor condition of the vessel.

== See also ==
Ships in class

- Dar Młodzieży
- Mir
- Pallada
- Khersones
- Nadezhda

Other

- List of large sailing vessels
