= Dar Młodzieży =

Polish sailing training ship

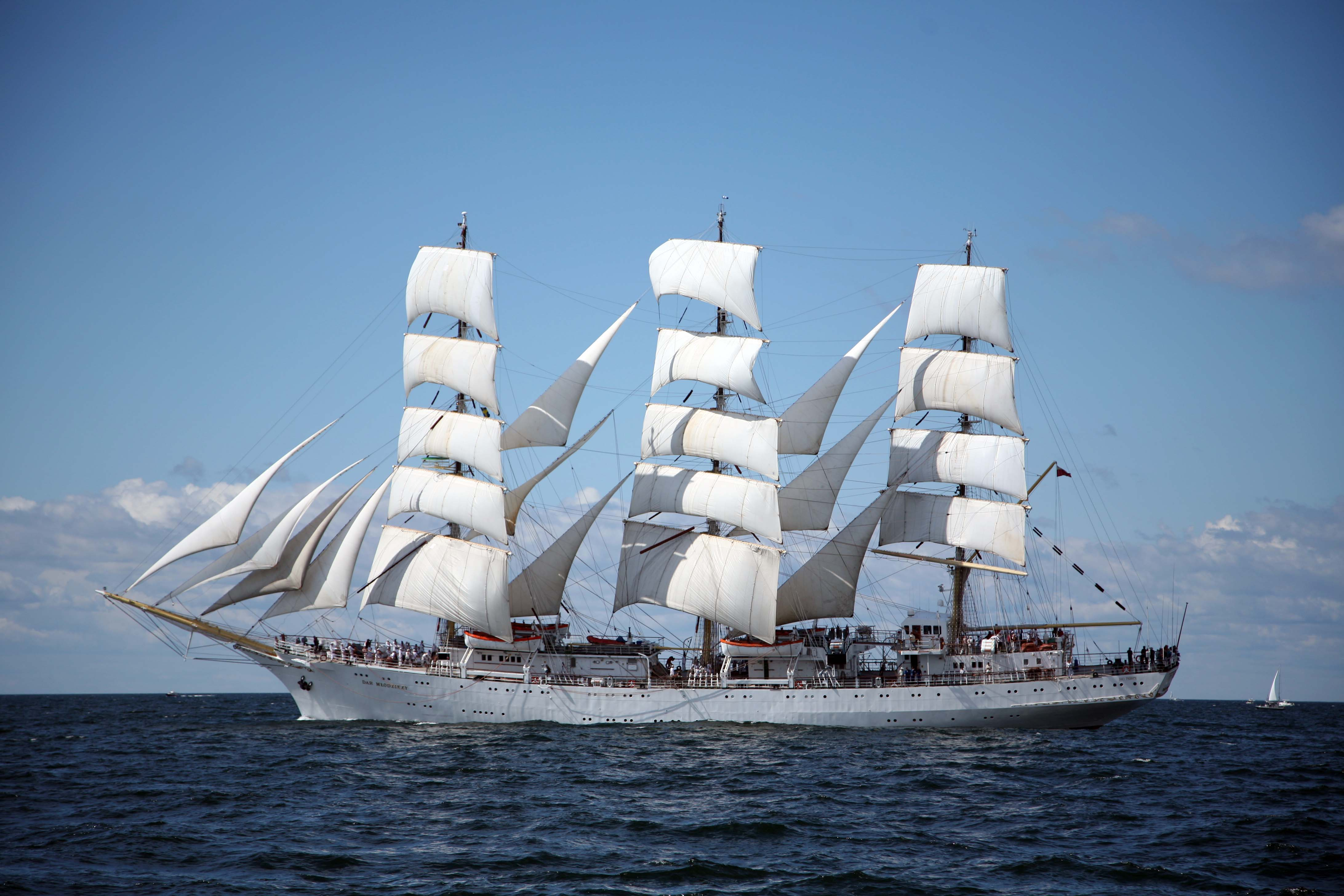
- Dar Młodzieży

History

Poland
- Name: Dar Młodzieży
- Port of registry: Gdynia
- Builder: Gdańsk Shipyard
- Yard number: B95/1
- Launched: November 1981
- In service: 4 July 1982
- Identification: Call sign: SQLZ; MMSI number: 261148000; IMO number: 7821075
- Status: in active service, as of 2019

General characteristics
- Type: Tall ship
- Tonnage: 2,384.85 GRT; 335.37 NT
- Displacement: 2,946 t (2,899 long tons; 3,247 short tons)
- Length: 108.8 m (357 ft) o/a; 79.4 m (260 ft) p/p
- Beam: 12 m (39 ft)
- Height: 62.1 m (204 ft)
- Depth: 6.3 m (21 ft)
- Propulsion: 2 × 750 PS (552 kW) Cegielski-Sulzer Type 8 AL 20/24 diesel engines, 2 screws
- Sail plan: Full-rigged ship, sail area: 3,015 m^{2} (32,450 sq ft)
- Speed: 12 knots (22 km/h; 14 mph) (engines); 16 knots (30 km/h; 18 mph) (sails)
- Range: Highest daily mileage : 264.7 nmi (490.2 km; 304.6 mi) at average 11.29 kn (21 km/h; 13 mph) under sail
- Crew: 176 (40 crew and 136 cadets)
- Armament: none

Dar Młodzieży (Polish: Gift of the Youth) is a Polish sail training ship designed by Zygmunt Choreń. A prototype of a class of six, the following five slightly differing units were built subsequently by the same shipyard for the merchant fleet of the former Soviet Union. Her sister ships are Mir, Druzhba, Pallada, Khersones, and Nadezhda.

The ship was launched in November 1981 at the Gdańsk Shipyard, Poland, and commissioned for service in July 1982 at Gdynia, thus replacing her forerunner Dar Pomorza. Her home port is Gdynia. The Dar Młodzieży is the first Polish-built, ocean-going sailing vessel to circumnavigate the globe (1987–88), thus repeating the famous voyage of her predecessor (1934–35).

== Images ==
Dar Młodzieży
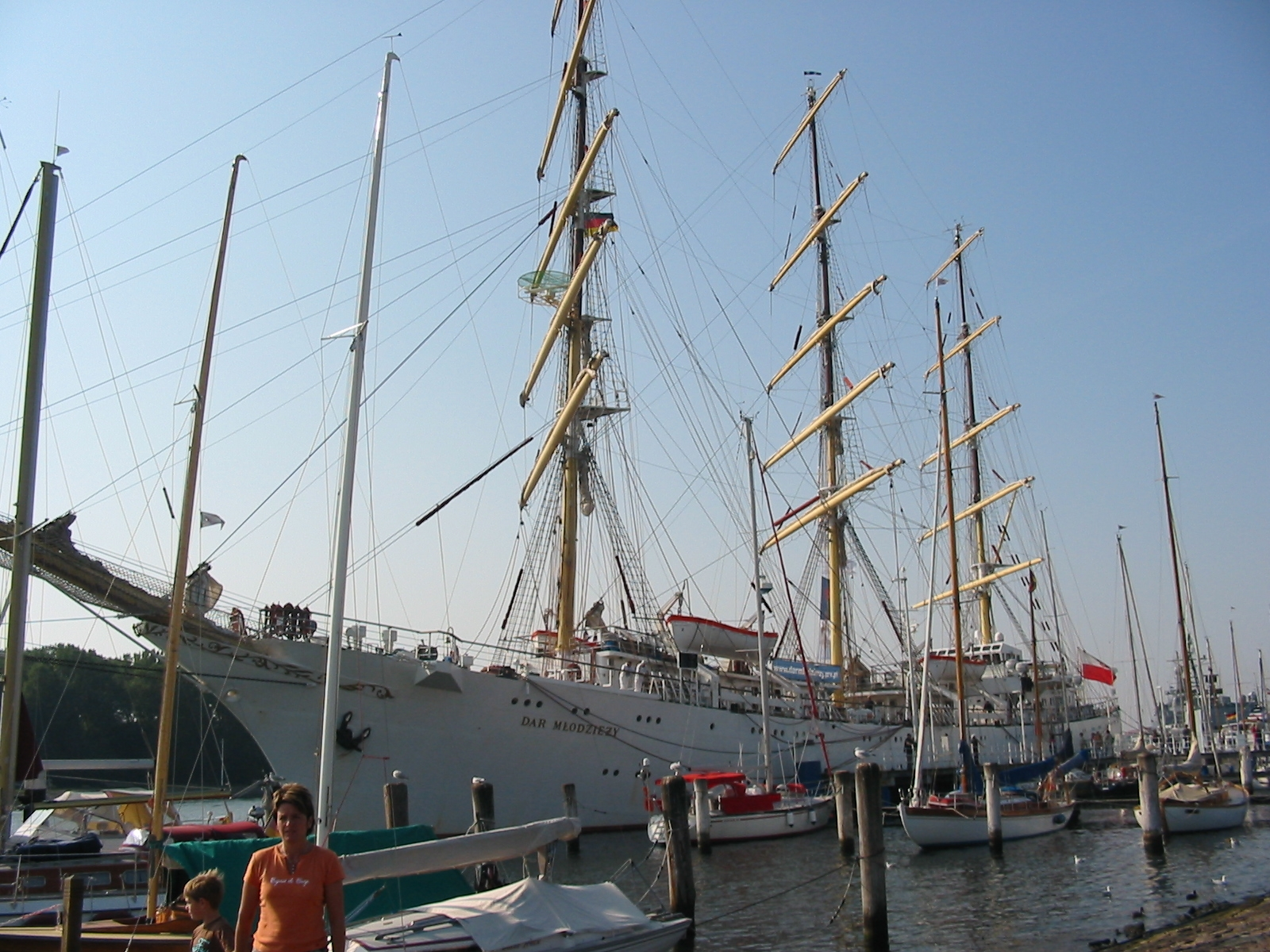
Docked in Travemünde (2006), Germany

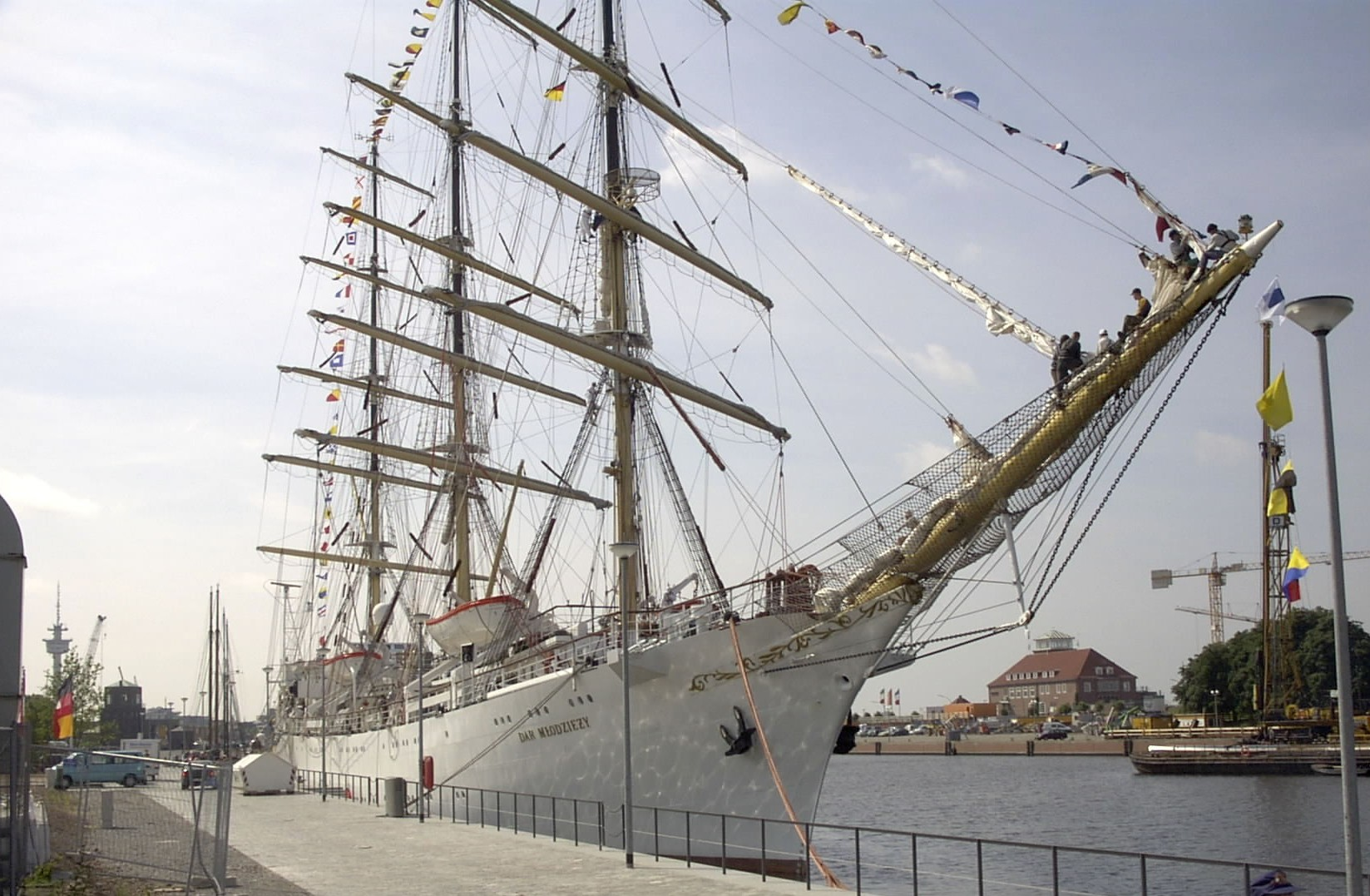
Bow view (2005)

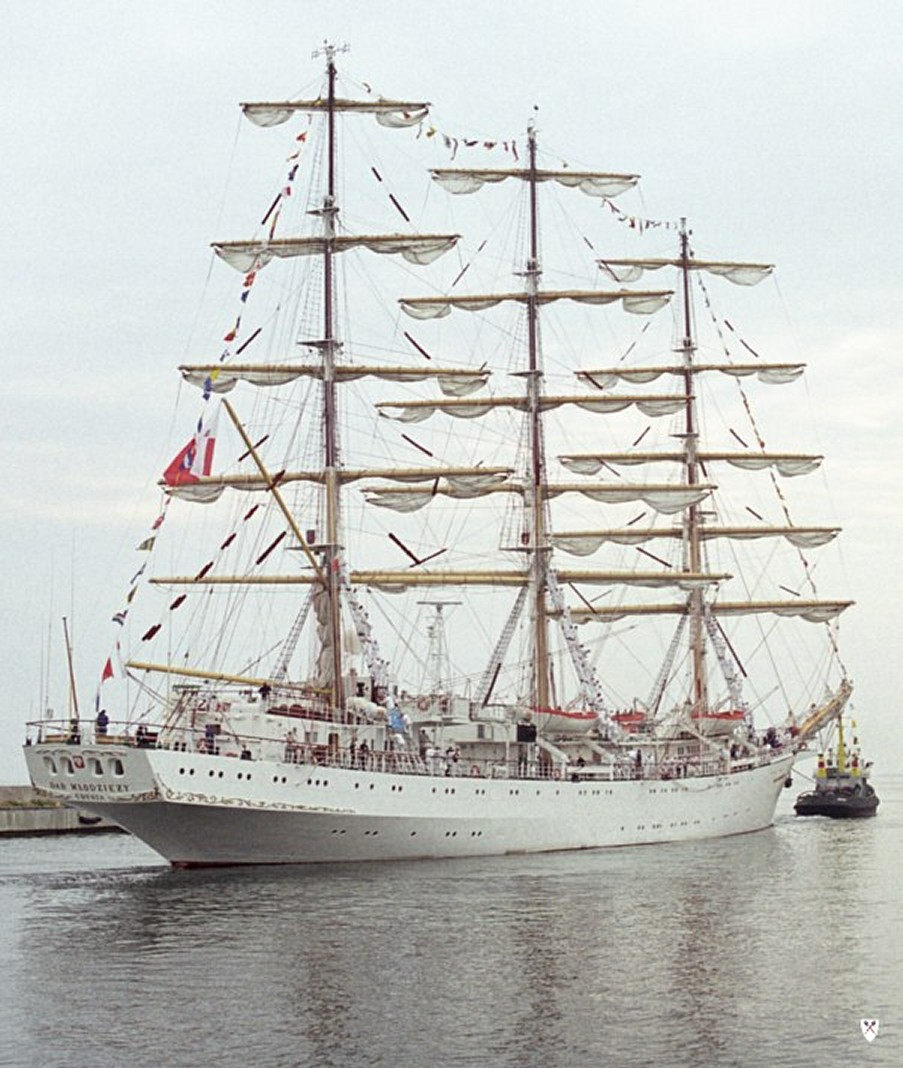
Side view (2005)

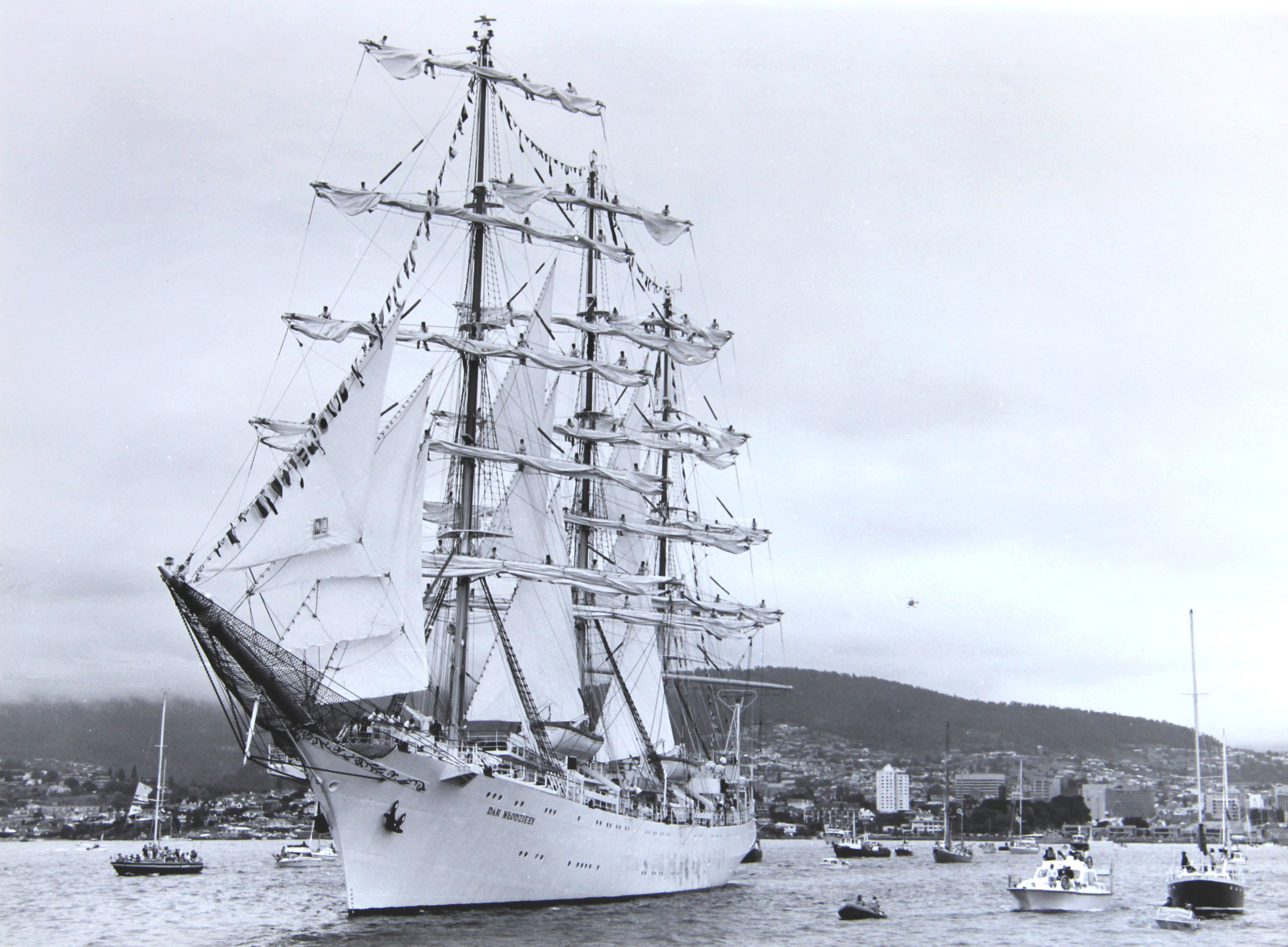
on River Derwent, Tasmania (1988)

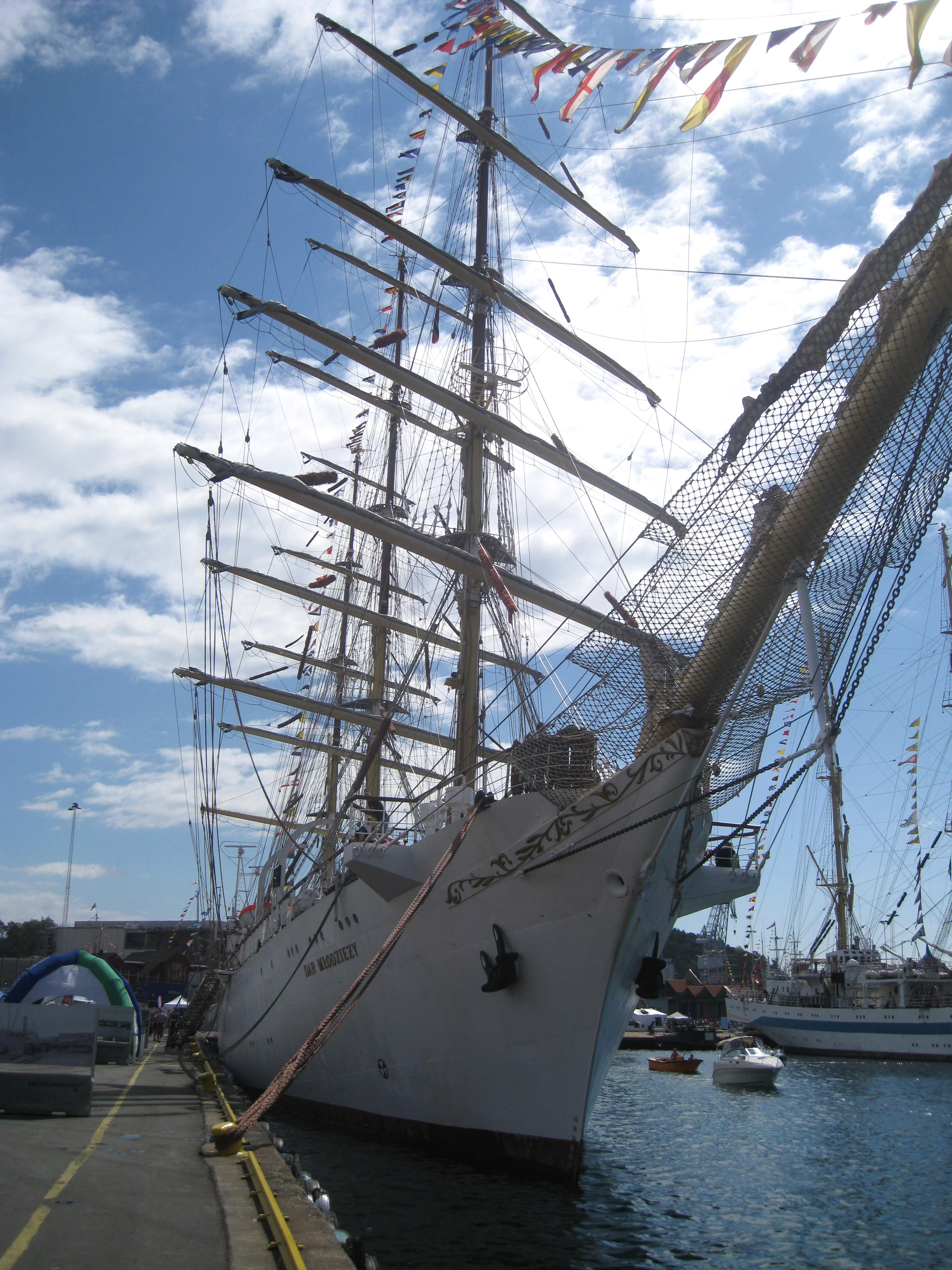
Kristiansand (2010)

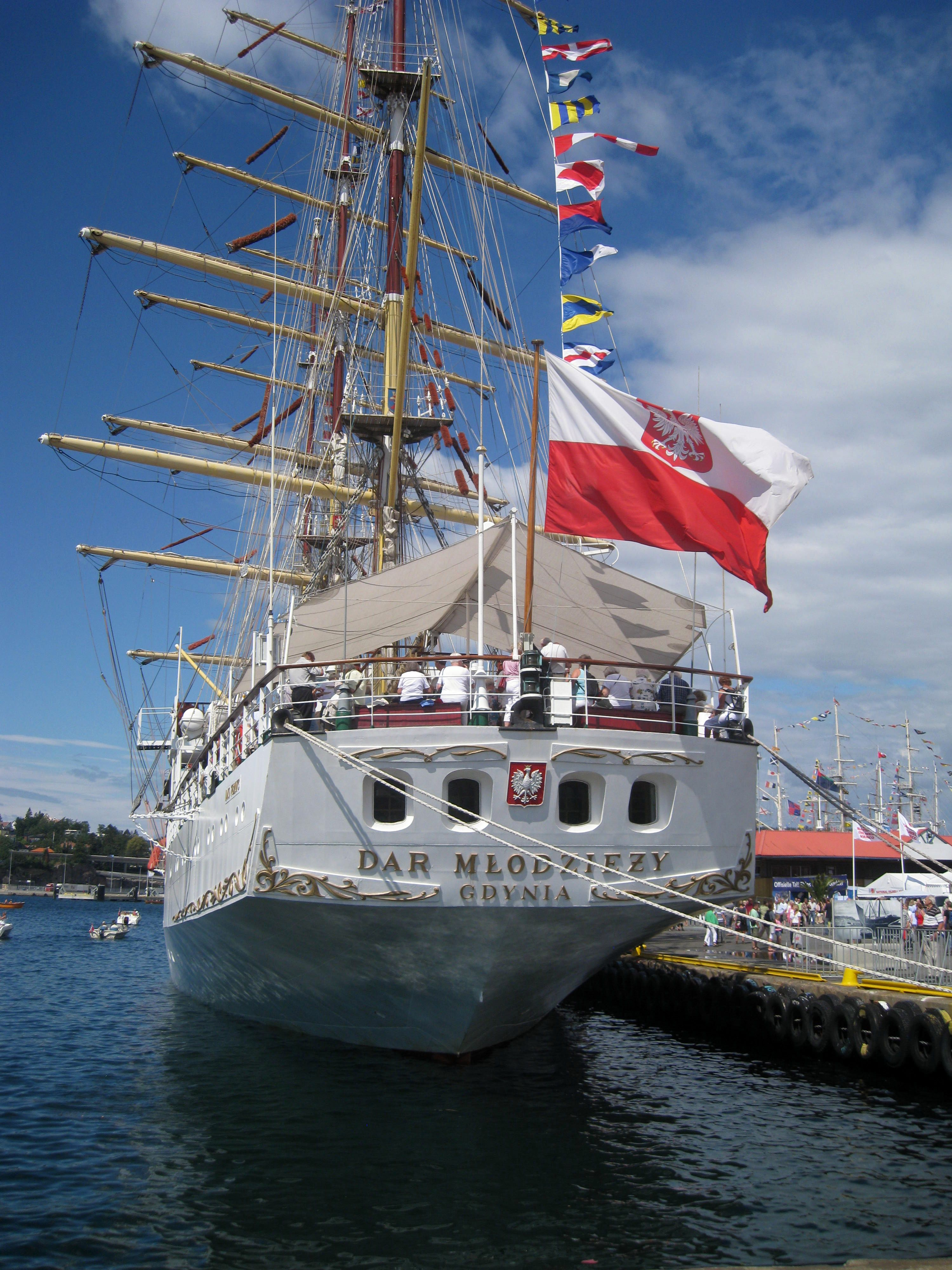
Kristiansand (2010)

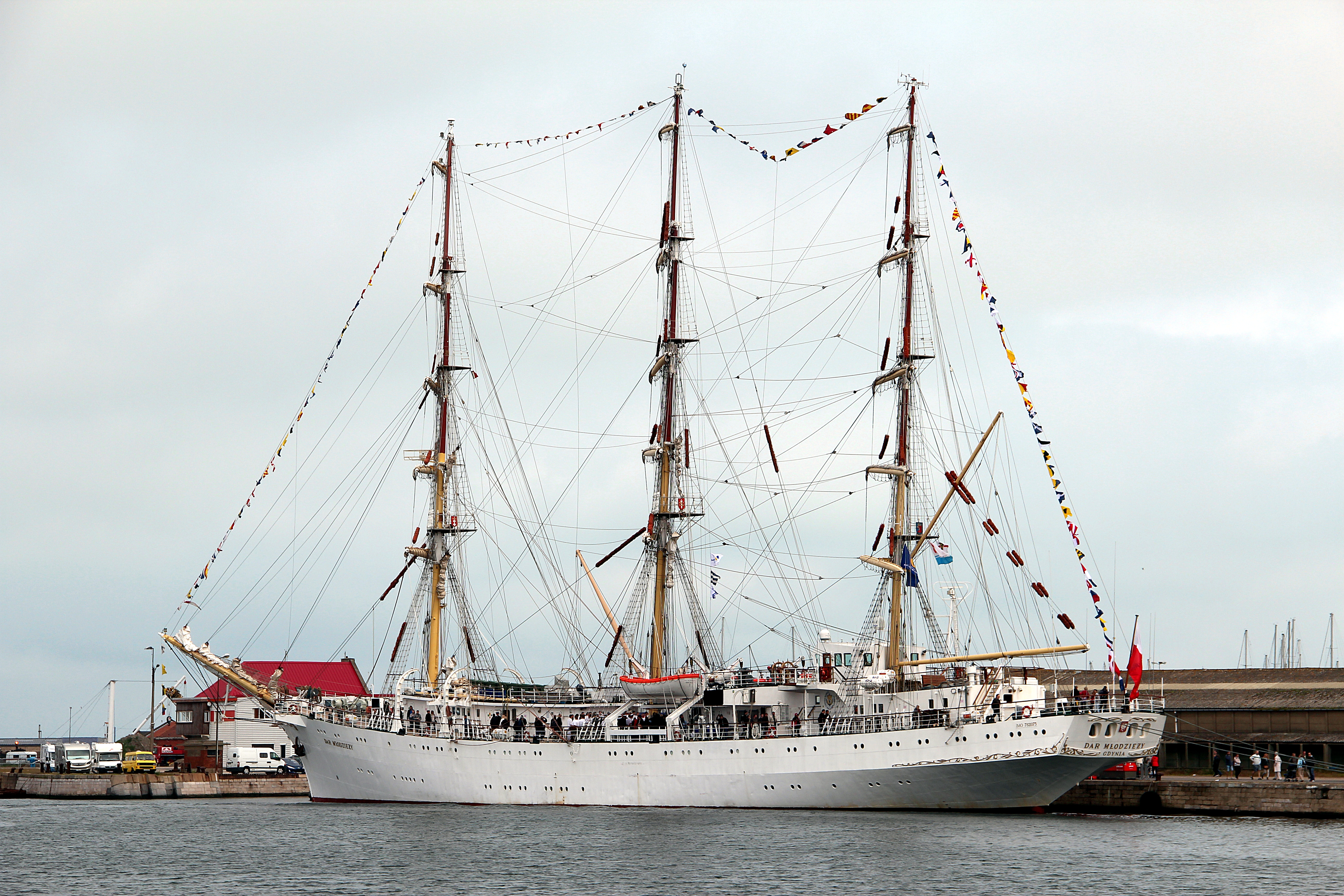
Dunkirk (2013)

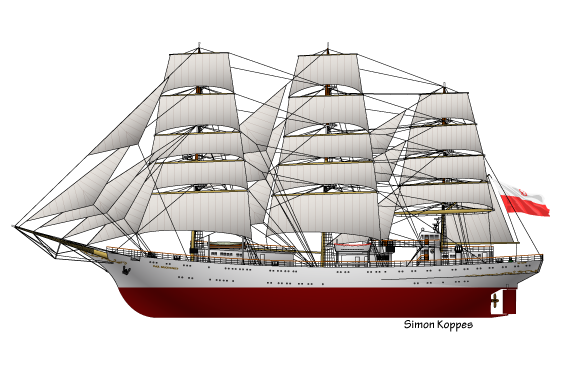
Line art of the Dar Młodzieży

Video (2016)

== See also ==
- List of large sailing vessels
