= STS Mir =

Russian training ship

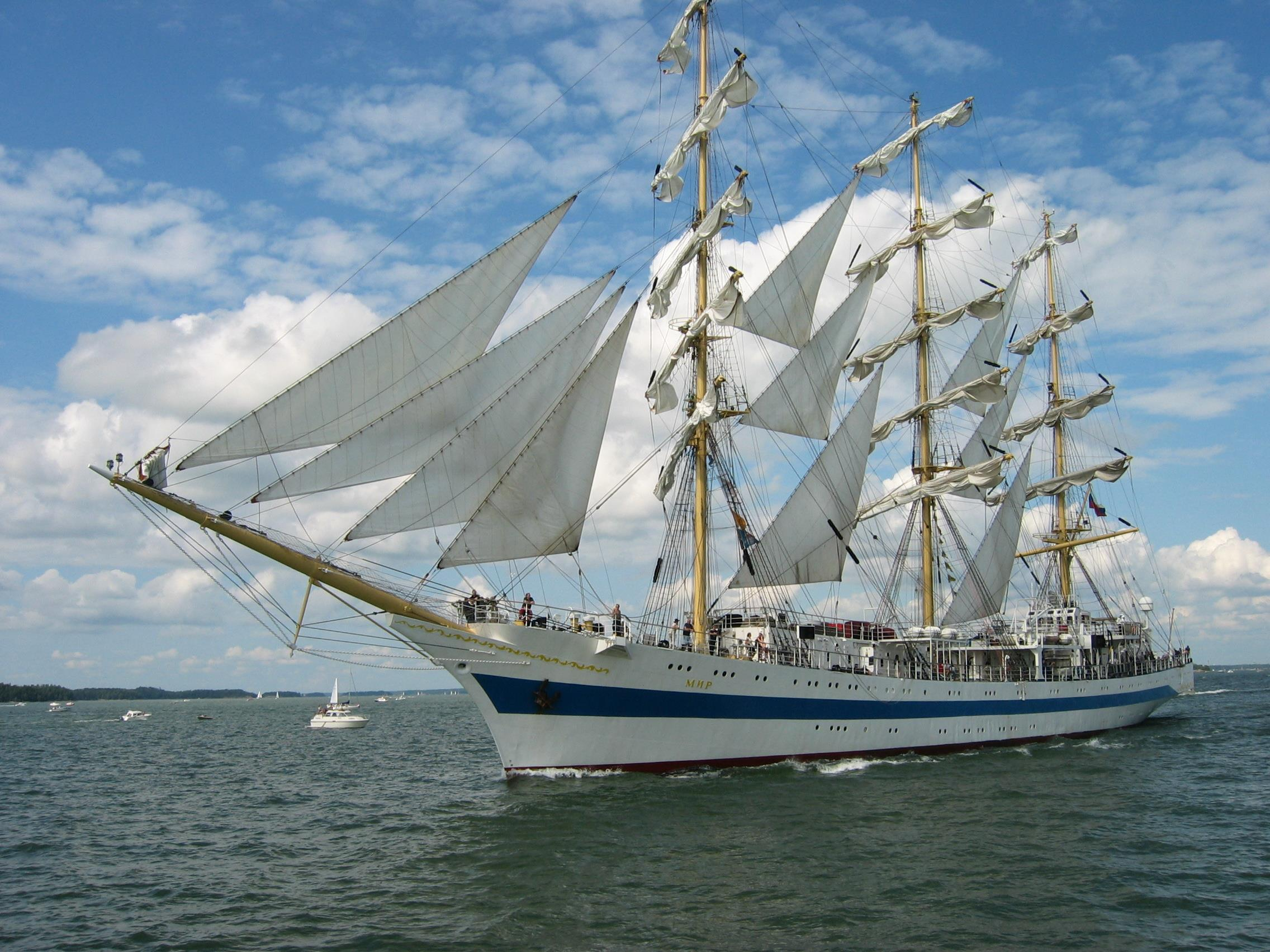
- The Mir

History

Russia
- Builder: Lenin Shipyard in Gdańsk, Poland
- Launched: 31 March 1987
- Identification: IMO number: 8501701; Call sign: UFPV; MMSI number: 273133800
- Status: Active

General characteristics
- Displacement: 2,385 tonnes (2,347 long tons; 2,629 short tons)
- Length: 109.2 m (358 ft)
- Beam: 13.9 m (46 ft)
- Draft: 6.3 m (21 ft)
- Propulsion: 2 diesel engines (1,140 hp total)
- Speed: 19.4 kn (22.3 mph)
- Complement: 195 (Professional crew: 55; Cadets: 140)
- Notes: Sail area: 2,771 m^{2} (29,830 sq ft)

STS Mir (Russian: Мир, lit. 'Peace') is a three-masted, full-rigged training ship, based in St. Petersburg, Russia. It was built in 1987 at the Lenin Shipyard in Gdańsk, Poland.

Mir is the second largest of six sister ships designed by Polish naval architect Zygmunt Choreń and weighs 2,385 tonnes. It is 109.2 m long, with a beam of 13.9 m and a draught of 6.3 m. The main mast is 52 m high and along with the other masts supports a total sail area of 2,771 m^{2}.

Its sister ships are Dar Młodzieży, Druzhba, Pallada, Khersones, and Nadezhda. Mir is 8 m shorter than the second longest current sailing ship, the STS Sedov (117.5 m). Its shipowner is the Admiral Makarov State Maritime Academy (AMSMA) in Saint Petersburg.

== Background ==
This ship was originally constructed as a cadet training ship, designed for carrying between 70 and 144 cadets. The total transport capacity is 199 people.

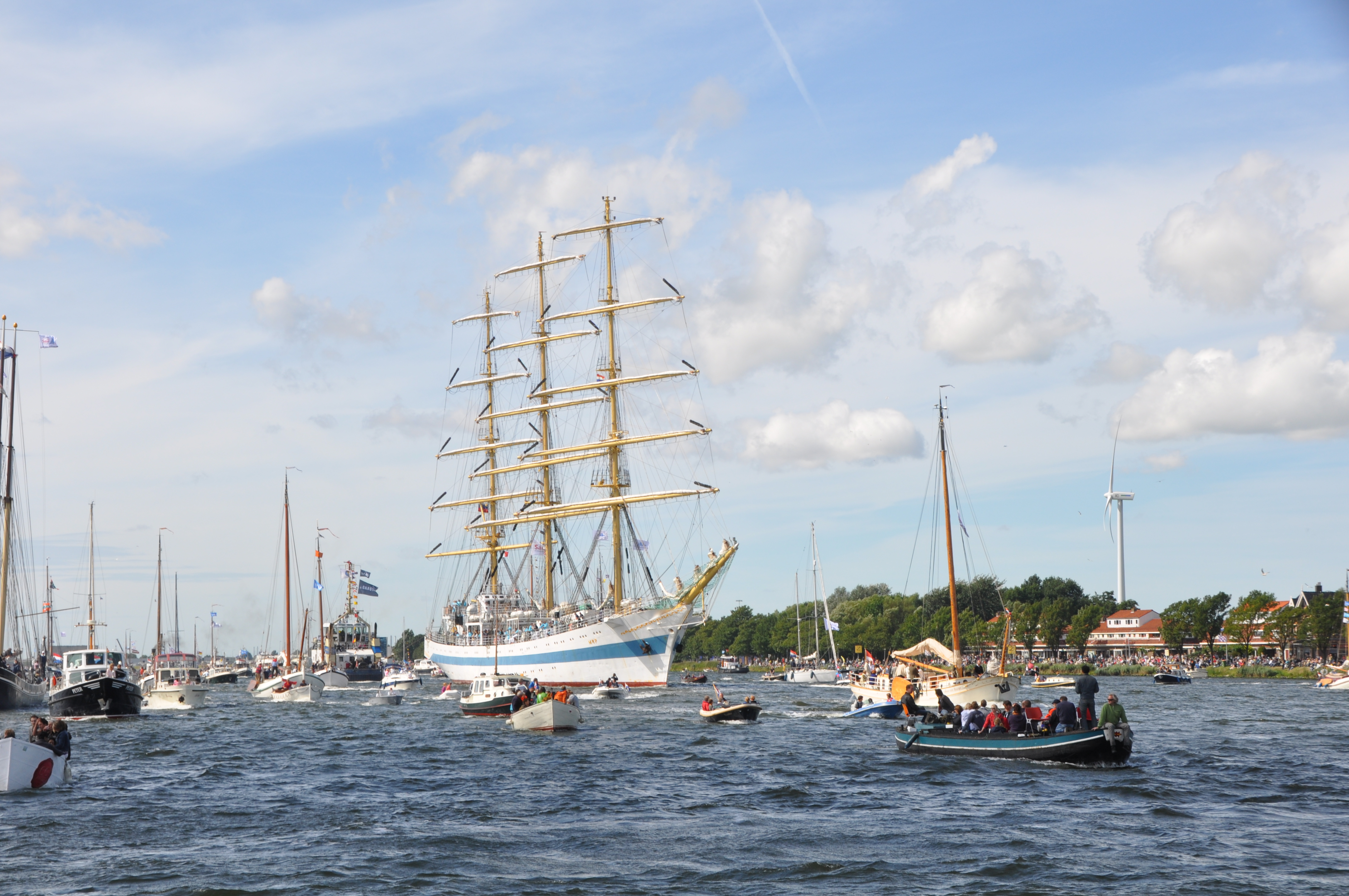
STS Mir reaches the port of Amsterdam through North Sea Canal

== Achievements ==
Mir has taken part in races, including the annual The Tall Ships' Races organised by Sail Training International. In the Grand Regatta Columbus 1992, celebrating the discovery of America by Christopher Columbus in 1492, Mir came out as the winner.

== STS Mir at Trafalgar 2005 ==
During the afternoon of the 28 June 2005 Elizabeth II, as Lord High Admiral of the United Kingdom, embarked on board HMS Endurance and, escorted by THV Patricia, set sail to review a fleet of over 167 ships from over 30 nations.

== See also ==
- List of large sailing vessels
