= RV Oceania =

Research vessel operated by the Polish Academy of Sciences

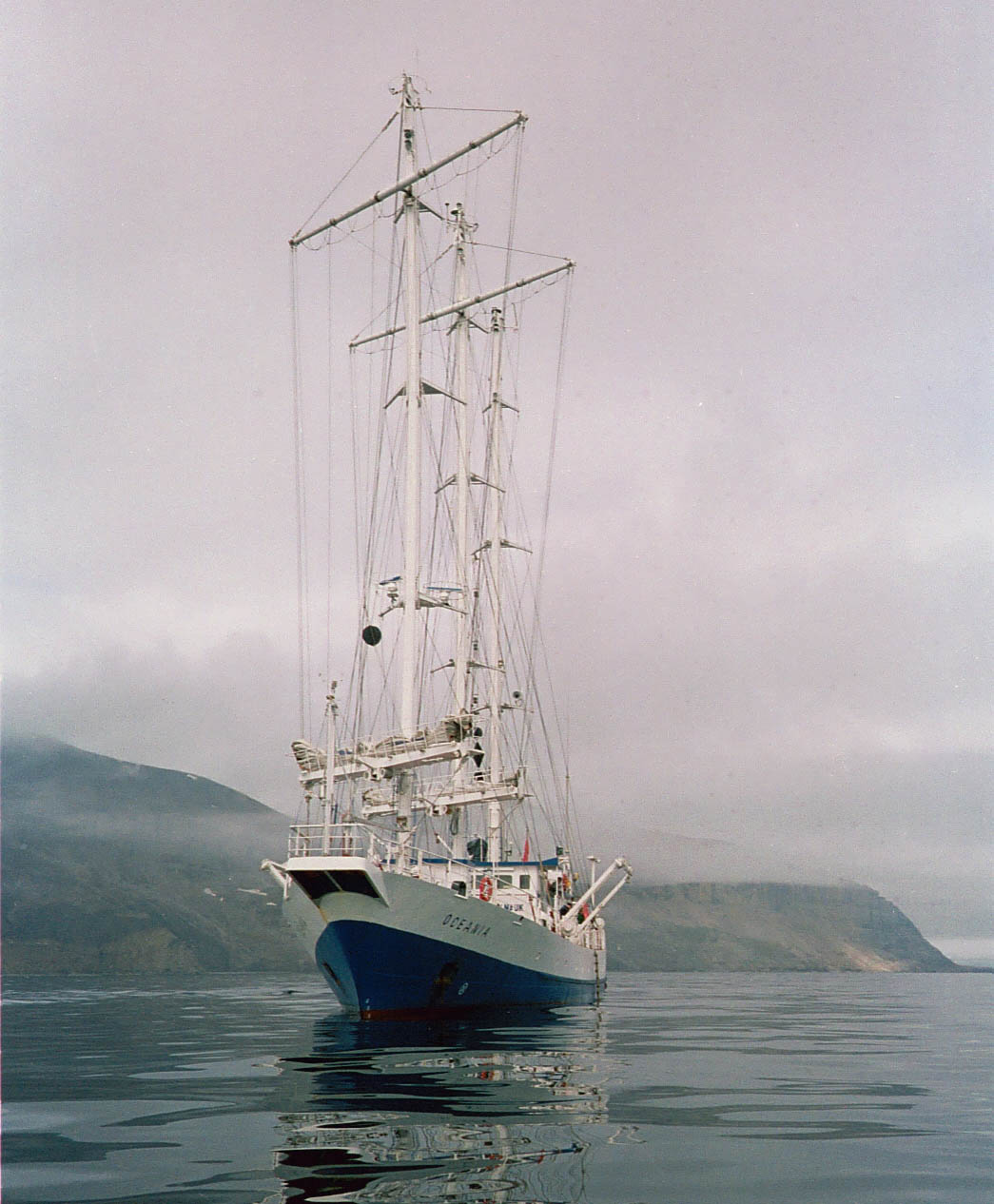
- RV Oceania

History

Poland
- Builder: Gdańsk Shipyard, Gdańsk
- Launched: 1985
- Home port: Gdańsk
- Identification: IMO number: 8304854; MMSI number: 261000150; Callsign: SQOC
- Status: Operational

General characteristics
- Tonnage: 370 GT
- Length: 48.9m
- Beam: 9.0m
- Height: 32.0m
- Draught: 3.8m
- Propulsion: Diesel, 816 hp with controllable pitch propeller, bow thrusters 70 hp, 430 m^{2} sails on 3 masts
- Speed: 6 kn on sails, 13.5 kn on engine
- Endurance: 1 month
- Boats & landing craft carried: 2 inflatable outboards
- Complement: 13 crew, 14 scientists

RV Oceania, or SY Oceania, is a tall ship, owned by the Polish Academy of Sciences, and used as a research vessel.

She was built in 1985 in the Gdańsk Shipyard in Poland, after the design of Zygmunt Choreń. The hull was based on plans of earlier tall ships: ORP Iskra II and Pogoria, but its rigging was different. Oceania was originally a full-rigged ship, with three masts (each 32 metres high). On every mast there was only one sail, in the shape of a vertical rectangle (sometimes Oceania was classified as a frigate), but later the yards and the sail from the mizzen-mast were removed. Sails are raised and driven hydraulically.

The ship is equipped with laboratories able to provide hydrographic, optic, acoustic, chemical, biological and particulate experiments and observations.
