= Khersones =

Khersones can refer to:

- Chersonesos, archeological site in Crimea
- Khersones (ship), tall ship from Ukraine
- MV Khersones, a Russian coastal tanker
