= VitaliV =

Russian painter

VitaliV or Vitali V, real name Vitali Vinogradov, (born c. 1957) is a contemporary British artist, sharing his time between the UK and Italy studios. He creates abstract art inspired by patterns in microchips. He initially referred to his artistic style based on microchips computer design as "digital art" but the term seemed too generic, and the artist soon decided in favour of "schematism" (like "vorticism" or "suprematism") – the term he invented himself to represent his signature style. Some of his works have been laser-cut in relief and then hand-painted as 3D objects.

== Biography ==
Vitali was born in Odessa (in Ukraine, U.S.S.R.) in 1957. He studied engineering and classical painting. VitaliV received his first degree (engineering) from the Odessa Maritime College. Thereafter, he was deployed to different locations in the Russian Arctic and Siberia for 6 years.

In 1979 Vitali moved to St. Petersburg (then Leningrad) and in 1983 he enrolled at the St. Petersburg Academy of Arts, first, as a part-time and subsequently, as a full-time student in the sculpture department.

In 1989 he won a scholarship at the Norwich University College of the Arts in the UK as an exchange student. In 1989 he lived in the legendary St. Petersburg underground art squat Мансарды "Аптека Пеля". From 1991 onwards Vitali has resided in London. He currently commutes between his London and Italian studios. In his earlier years in the UK he supported himself by organising a photocopiers retail business with Russia. He later founded the TV3 network.

In 1993 Vitali established an Art Community which became known as "Bank", as it was based in the former Barclays Bank building on Shoreditch High Street, Hoxton. It was a pioneering multimedia arts centre where he held series of OMSK short film festivals, organised conceptual art exhibitions, sculpture shows (including monumental sculptures), video installations and displayed works produced in new, digital, media formats.

Since 2007 Vitali has been sharing his time between his UK and Italian studios.

== Art ==
Vitali moved to the UK in 1989. On completing his degree at the Norwich University College of the Arts and after a number of successful painting and sculpture shows, he led a community of artists and film connoisseurs in Hoxton and other parts of London. While living in London and studying contemporary art, VitaliV also found and developed his signature style, known as "schematism". The essence of his style are simple geometrical patterns—circles and lines connected at 45° angles. According to the artist, "in the mid-1990s I was living and working in London. These were the years before the Internet took over. I was thinking about how exciting it would be to create a cyberspace museum, both as an artist and as a businessman. If I didn’t do it, someone else might, and then I would miss this chance of a lifetime!" While still thinking on it, I opened up a computer and became suddenly fascinated with its motherboard. I immediately loved the look of it: it was complicated and fantastical with a green or red base and lots of golden lines. It was a piece of art in its own right; I like the aesthetics and the logic, so I thought about starting to make art based on this". In 2008 VitaliV ran a joint project Digital Butterfly with artist Pino Signoretto in Murano, Venice.

With fellow Russian artist, Unus Safardiar, in November 1997 Vitali V created "Three Tonnes of Food in One Go". The sculpture was of a half eaten banquet, together with Wedgewood crockery and silver cutlery, embedded in clear resin. The artists claimed it was the first sculpture made using knives, forks and teeth.

Eventually, Vitali ventured into design and decorative arts, applying the principles of "schematism" in various fields and experimenting with tableware, porcelain, designer fashion clothes, accessories and furniture, as well as jewellery. Among his recent projects is the Jewellery collection for ZBird (China). He also released his fashion collections and launched them during French Fashion week in 2008 (Zone, the Louvre, Paris, France) and London Fashion Week in 2009.

According to ArtRabbit, "his practice is both eccentric and technologically innovative, consisting of a range of lightboxes, CNC laser-cut reliefs, aluminium and acrylic resins and a 3D film".

=== Art-historical context ===
Schematism has been discussed in the relation to earlier forms of geometric abstraction and twenty-century modernism. In Art on World Magazine, September 2026, Angelina Cebotari (Director of MA Gallery) examined Schematism in relation to Suprematism, Vorticism and Constructivism,, proposing that its geometric vocabulary responds to the networking and digital environment of the twenty-first Century.

== Gallery ==
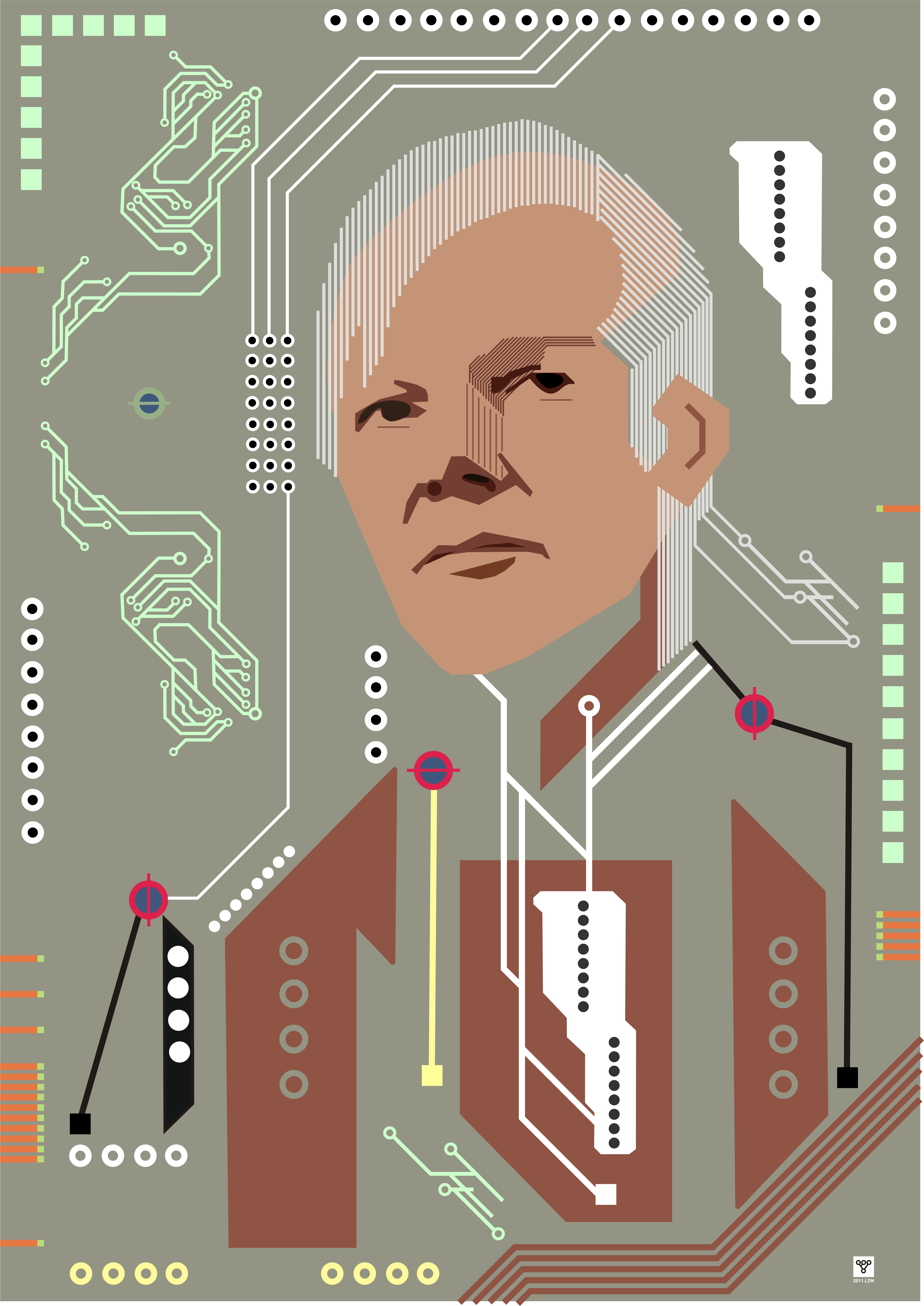
Julian Assange

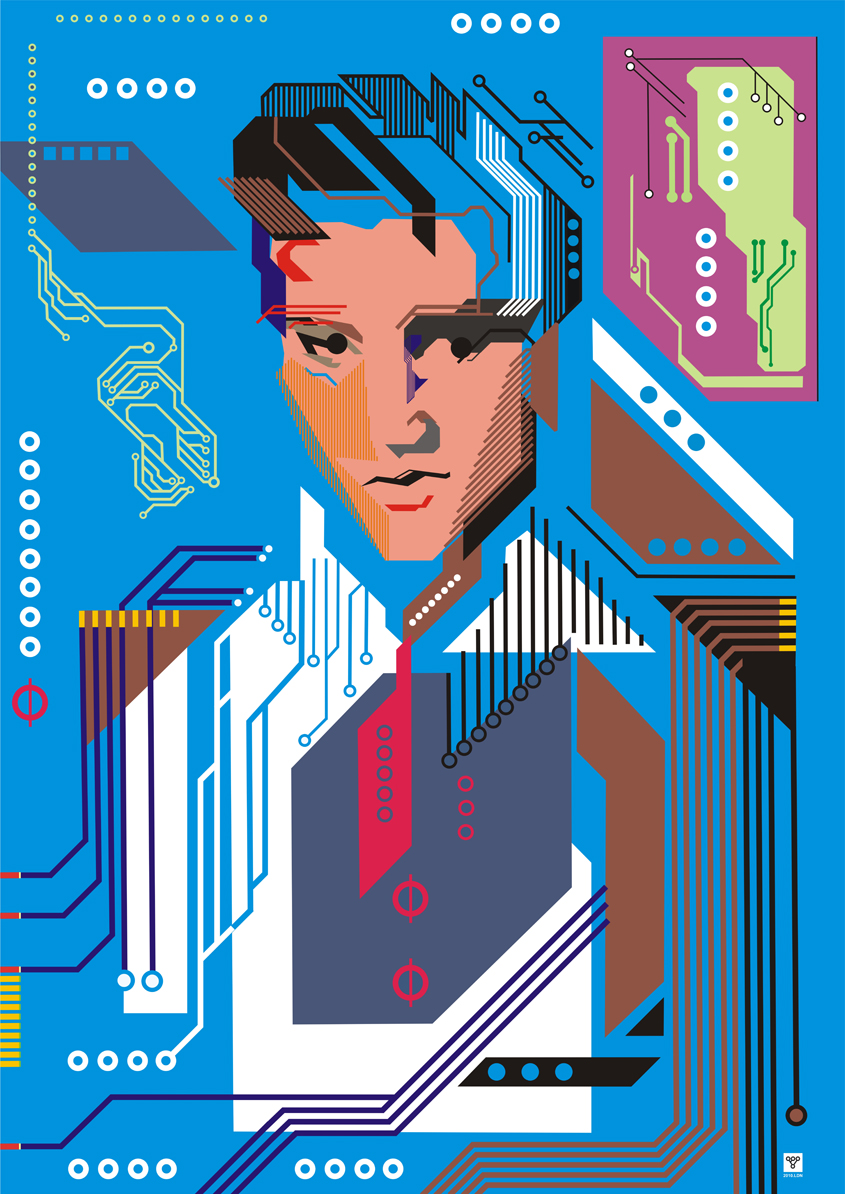
Elvis Presley

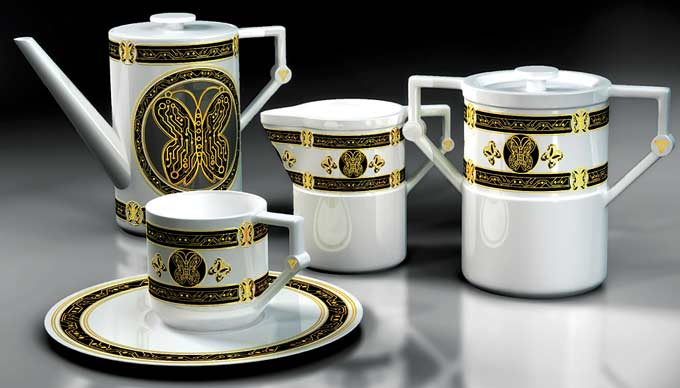
Porcelain Service by VitaliV

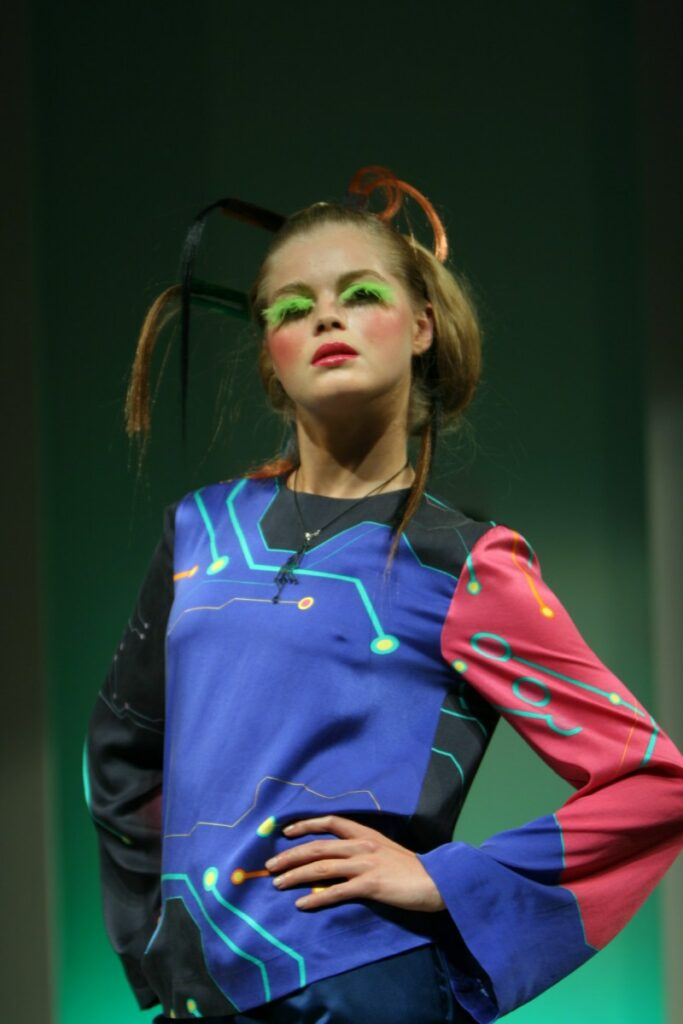
Fashion by VitaliV

== Exhibitions ==
Select Exhibitions, Shows and Projects include:

- 2026. "Art Basel, Volta" Basel, Switherland.
- 2024. "Nomads of the Future" Medina Gallery, Rome
- 2021. "A premonition of the Future" Russian State Museum, Saint Petersburg
- 2019. Exhibition, organised by MA Gallery, London
- 2018 "Digital Porcelain Collections". organised by MA Gallery, London
- 2014-2015 Jewellery collections for ZBird (China)
- 2013 The Dinner is served, The State Russian Museum, Saint-Petersburg.
- 2011 The Fourth Moscow Biennale of contemporary art, Fabrica, Moscow.
- 2011 VideoAkt, International Biennale, Barcelona.
- 2011 Infame, Forman's Smokehouse gallery, London.
- 2010 Digital life, Salon Gallery, London.
- 2009 Moda, Picture, Style, State Russian Museum, Saint-Petersburg.
- 2008 Digital Butterfly by Pino Signoretto, project. Murano, Venice.
- 2007 Digital metamorphosis, Summer Gardens, State Russian Museum, Saint-Petersburg.
- 2006 Digital art, Sands, Las-Vegas.
- 2000 Cook-art, Islington Design Centre, London.
- 1999 S.Rossine & VitalyV, New Burlington gallery, London.
- 1999 Three tons of food, Bank, London.
- 1999 Temporary radio, Radio Suisse, Geneva.
- 1996 Africa, Kostroma, VitalyV, SEM, Saint-Petersburg.
- 1995 Three artists, Albemarle Gallery, London.
- 1995 Fragments, Merts Contemporary Gallery, London.
- 1994 A4 gallery, Flash art magazine, London.
- 1994 Real size of Fuji, Flash art magazine, London.
