= Joanna Pajkowska =

Polish sailor

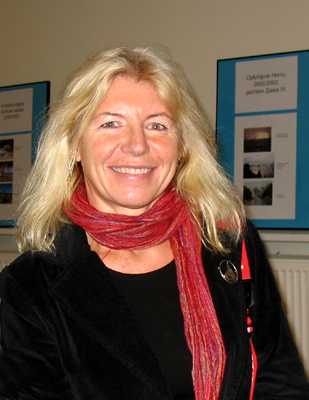
- Joanna Pajkowska, 2009
- Born: 13 July 1958 (age 67); Warsaw, Poland
- Other names: Asia Pajkowska, Joanna Broomhead

Joanna "Asia" Pajkowska (born 13 July 1958) is a Polish sailor. With a rank of captain, a sea life guard, she sailed over 250,000 nautical miles, often in singlehanded or in two-handed races. She is one of the best-known sailors in Poland and one of the most experienced ocean sailors in the world. In 2018, she completed singlehanded non-stop circumnavigation as the first Polish female sailor.

== Achievements ==
Between 1995 and 2002, when living in England, she worked as a member of the sea rescue team on board the Salcombe Lifeboat ship, of the Royal National Lifeboat Institution (RNLI), being one of the very few women members of this British sea rescue organization. She took part in several sea rescue operations.

In years 1995, 1997, 1999 she took part in the Fastnet Race. When living in UK she did club races and cruises across English Channel and Irish Sea.

Three times she sailed in the two-handed transatlantic races: in 1986 in the Two-Star from Plymouth in England to Newport, Rhode Island in the United States on the catamaran Alamatur III and in 2001 in the race Transat Jacques Vabre from Le Havre to Brazil, on board the 50 ft Olympian Challenger, and in TWOSTAR 2017, from Plymouth in England to Newport onboard s/y Rote 66 (Class 40), together with German sailor Uwe Röttgering; they won the race in the two-handed category.

In 2000, on the 40-foot yacht Ntombifuti she finished fourth in the class (in the field of 24 competitors) in the singlehanded transatlantic race OSTAR, from Plymouth to Newport. For her standing in the race she received the Honour Trophy of the Polish Yachting Association (Polski Związek Żeglarski) in the category of the Race of the Year 2000.

She took part in many multi-member team transatlantic races, including a female only crew on the 60-foot S/Y Alphagraphics in 2001 in the EDS Atlantic Challenge regatta, on course Saint-Malo – Hamburg – Portsmouth – Baltimore – Boston – Saint-Malo. In December 2002 and January 2003, on board S/Y Zjawa IV, she sailed three times around Cape Horn and reached the South Shetland archipelago at Antarctic. In the period between October 2006 and February 2007, in the two-member female only race around the world, on board the 28-foot boat Mantra Asia, she sailed halfway around the world (from Darwin in Australia, across the Indian Ocean to Cape Town in South Africa and further across the Atlantic to Salvador in Brazil, and she won her stage of the race.

== Single-handed sail ==
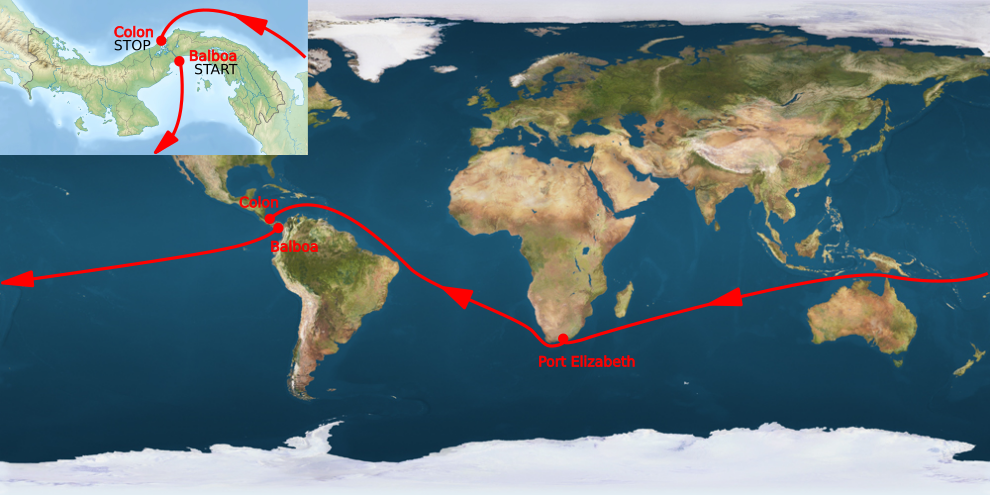
Voyage 2008/2009 of Joanna Pajkowskia

On 8 January 2009, Joanna Pajkowska completed in Colón, Panama her solo trip almost around the world with one stop (in Port Elizabeth). She did her trip on board the sailboat Mantra ASIA (model Mantra 28), with the LOA of 8.5 m, beam of 2.7 m and draft of 1.65 m. The boat has the displacement of 3.5 tons and 60 sqm of the sail surface. She was designed by Andrzej Armiński and built in his dockyard in Szczecin, Poland. Andrzej Armiński was also the main organizer and the sponsor of the event. The route was westward from Balboa, Panama, across Pacific Ocean, through Torres Strait, across Indian Ocean, around Cape of Good Hope and across Atlantic Ocean to Colón, Panama, and the estimated distance is 25,000 nautical miles. The trip lasted 198 days. For her trip Cpt. Pajkowska was awarded by the Polish Yachting Association (Polski Związek Żeglarski) Honorary Badge of Merit for Polish Sailing, and won the First Prize and "Silver Sextant" in the Rejs Roku (Sail Trip of the Year) competition. She was also awarded with the CONRAD International Award by the Baltic Shores Brotherhood (Bałtyckie Bractwo Wybrzeża).

In 2010–2011, on board the same boat Mantra ASIA, this time together with her husband Cpt. Aleksander Nebelski she did another trip from Florida, through the Panama Canal, across the Pacific Ocean, Australia, Indonesia, South-East Asia, across the Indian Ocean and the Red Sea to the Mediterranean Sea, sailing over 22,000 nm in almost a year and a half. For the third time she received the Honour Trophy in the Rejs Roku (Sailor of the Year) competition.

In 2012, she sailed in Svalbard Archipelago.

== Ostar again ==
In 2013, again she took part in the OSTAR Race, this time on board a 40 ft catamaran Cabrio 2, and she finished 1st Lady. In the same year on board the same catamaran she crossed the Atlantic Ocean four times, apart from the OSTAR Race, two-handed or with a crew of 3. For this achievement she received the Second Prize in the Rejs Roku (Sailor of the Year) competition.

Cpt. Pajkowska for several years now keeps taking part in singlehanded and two-handed races on the Baltic Sea (Polonez Cup, from Szczecin around the Christiansoe Island., and Battle of Gotland Cup, from Gdansk around Gotland Island). She often sails around the Baltic Sea and the North Sea with a base in Poland. Frequently she sails as a mate on board STS Pogoria, taking part in an Education Under Sails STA program for young people; she also does yacht deliveries, as well as a charter skipper.

== Transatlantic race again ==
In 2017, for the third time, Pajkowska took part in the OSTAR/TWOSTAR transatlantic race, from Plymouth, England to Newport, Rhode Island, U.S. This time, together with German sailor Uwe Röttgering, they took part in the two-handed TWOSTAR category. They started on board the 40-foot boat Rote 66, and they won in the two-handed category, in 20 days, 22 hours and 43 minutes. During that year race sailors experienced extreme weather conditions, including a storm with 60kns wind and 15-meters waves; as a result, out of 21 yachts that started from Plymouth, the finish line was reached by only seven boats (four boats had sunk). For this achievement for the second time she received the First Prize and Silver Sextant the most prestigious in the Polish sailing community award, in the Rejs Roku (Sailor of the Year) competition.

== Solo non-stop around the world ==
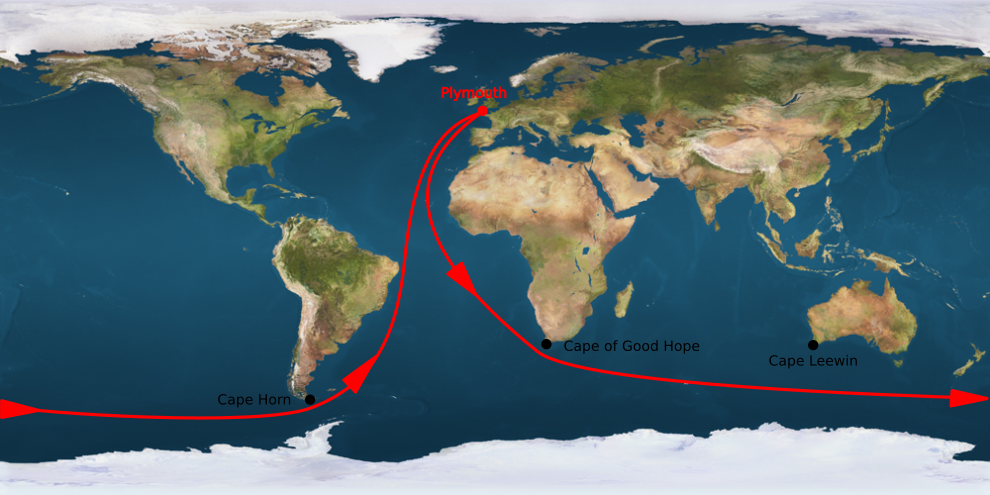
Voyage 2018/2019 of Joanna Pajkowskia

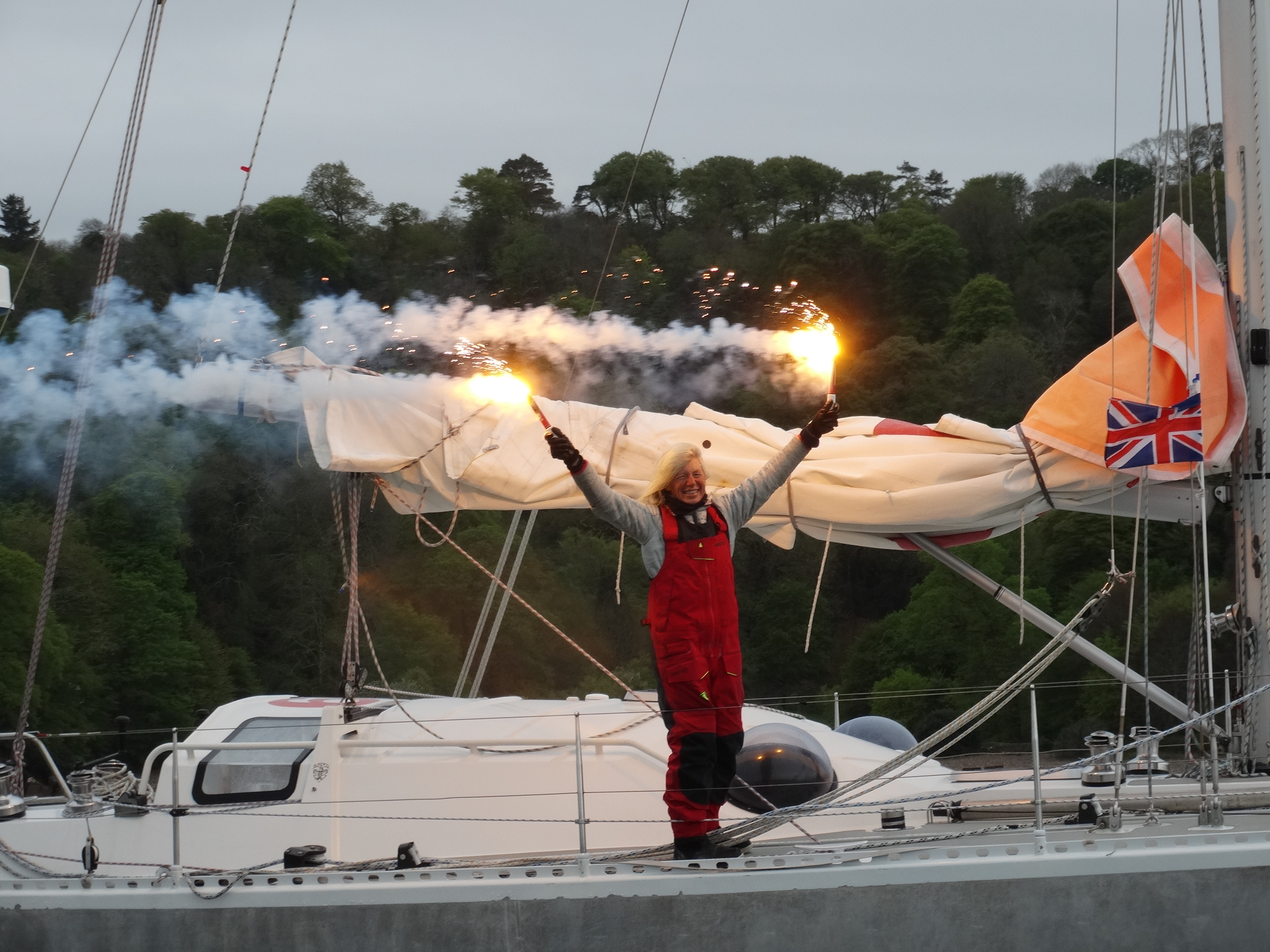
Cpt. Joanna Asia Pajkowska at the finish of her solo non-stop circumnavigation, Plymouth

On 28 May 2019, Pajkowska completed solo, not assisted, and non-stop circumnavigation, on board an aluminium boat s/y Fanfan (40 ft). She started from Plymouth on 23 September 2018. The route included traversing Cape of Good Hope, Cape Leeuwin and Cape Horn, and finish back in Plymouth. The trip took 216 days and 16 hours, and she sailed 29 000 nm. Pajkowska is the first and only Polish female sailor to complete such a trip. For her solo 360 nonstop circumnavigation, Pajkowska was awarded for the third time the First Prize and Silver Sextant, in the Rejs Roku (Sailor of the Year) competition. She is the only Polish yachtperson who received this precious award three times. For this outstanding achievement she was also awarded the Trans-Ocean Prize, the most prestigious German sailing award.
