= Zygmunt Choreń =

Polish naval architect

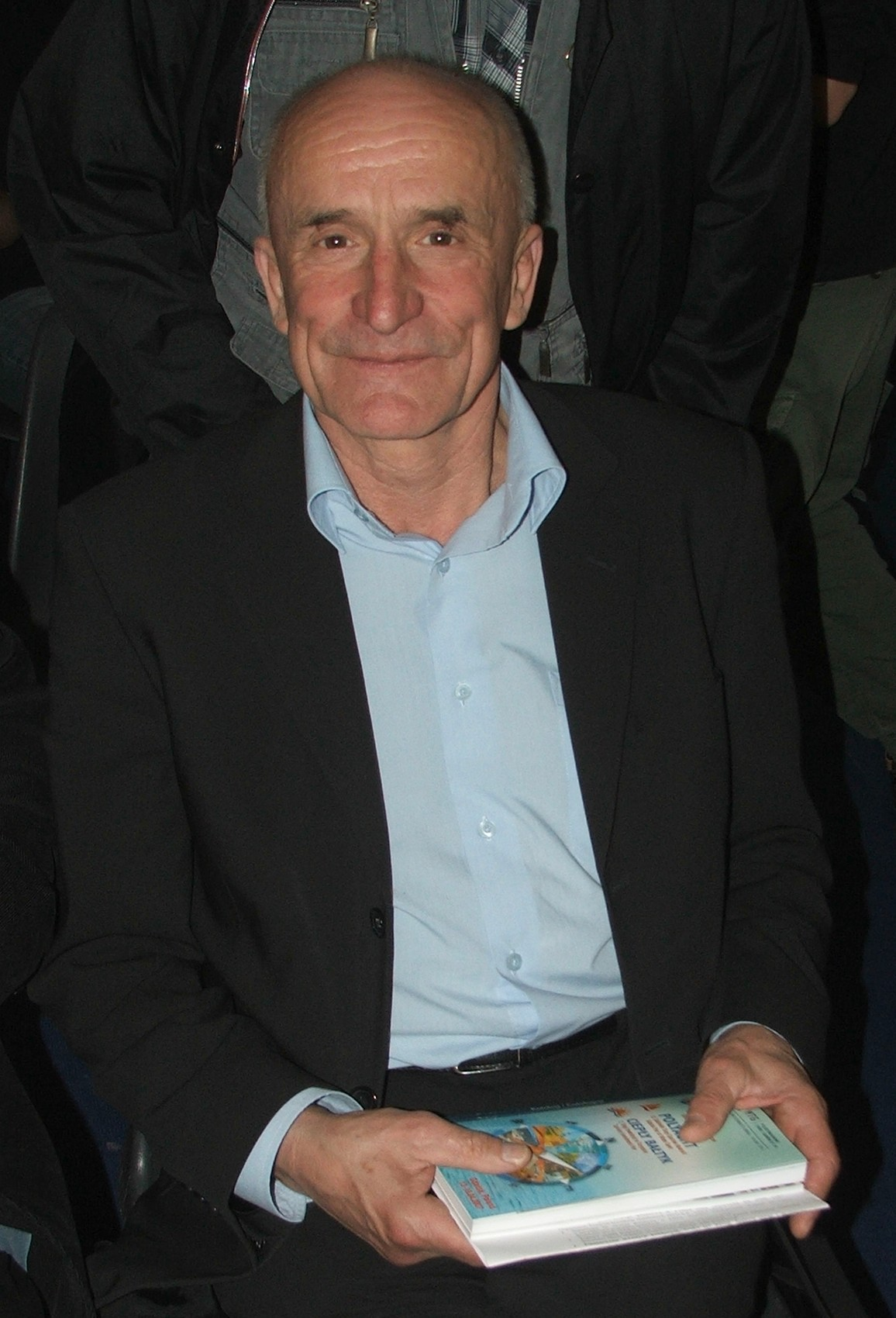
Zygmunt Choreń during the first meeting of the naval students from STS Pogoria, 14 April 2007, Gdańsk

Zygmunt Choreń (born 1941) is a Polish naval architect and the proprietor of the naval architectural firm Choreń Design and Consulting. He is a graduate of the Gdańsk University of Technology and the Leningrad Ship-Building Institute.

He was a crewmember in the Whitbread Round The World Race 1973-74 on the boat Otago.

== List of ships ==
List ships that have been designed or redesigned by Choreń:

- 1980 – STS Pogoria
- 1982 – Dar Młodzieży
- 1982 – Iskra II
- 1984 – STV Kaliakra
- 1985 – RV Oceania
- 1987 – Druzhba
- 1987 – STS Mir
- 1988 – Alexander von Humboldt (redesigned, launched 1906)
- 1989 – Khersones
- 1989 – Pallada
- 1991 – Nadezhda
- 1991 – STS Fryderyk Chopin
- 1991 – STS Kaisei
- 1995 – Estelle
- 2000 – SV Royal Clipper
- 2002 – Mephisto
- 2008 – Petit Prince
- 2010 – Running On Waves
- 2015 – STS Lê Quý Dôn
- 2017 – El-Mellah
- 2017 – Golden Horizon

== See also ==
- Naval architecture
