= Pogoria (ship) =

1980 Polish barquentine

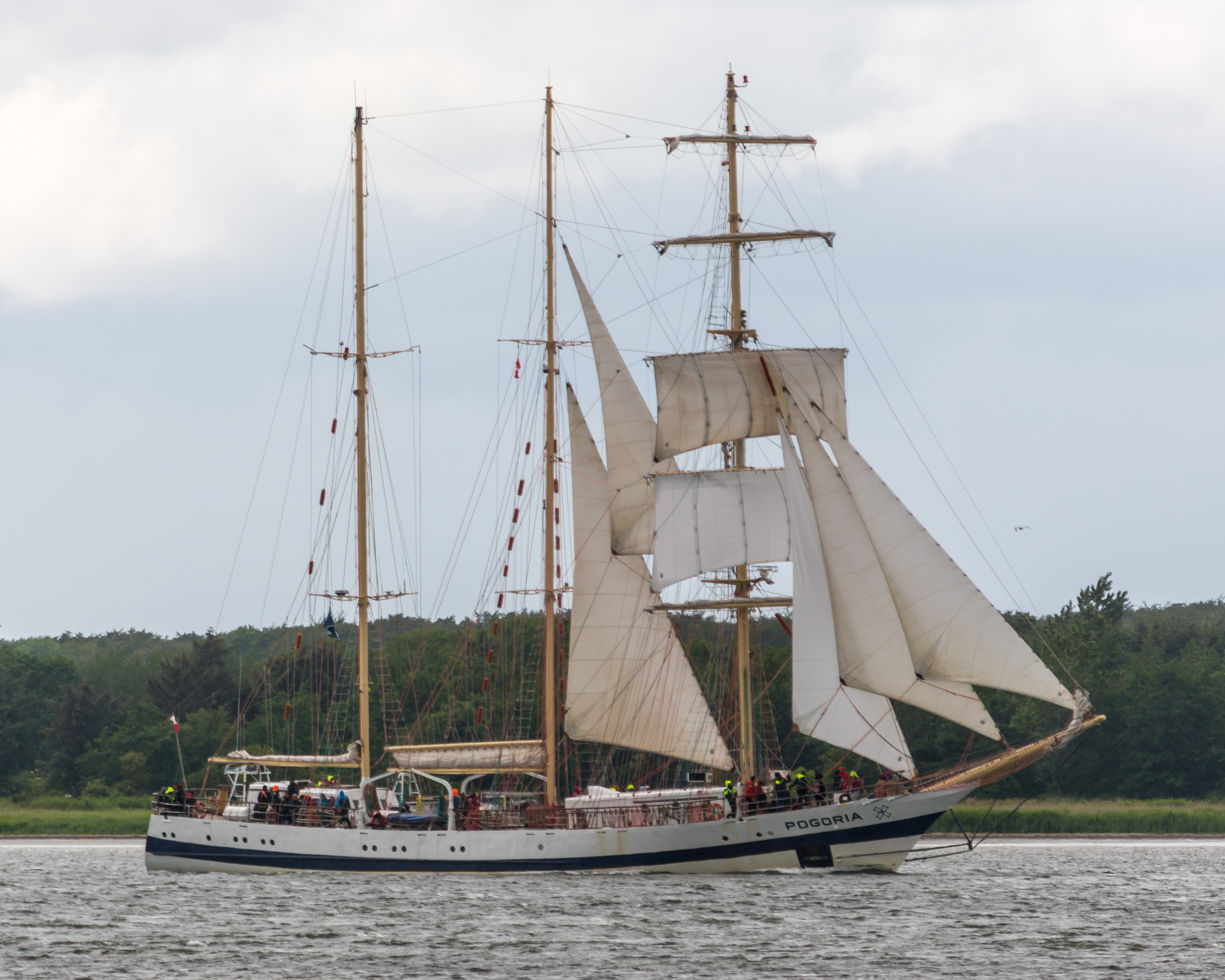

History

Poland
- Name: Pogoria
- Owner: Polish Government
- Builder: Gdańska Lenina
- Yard number: b79/01
- Launched: 23 January 1980
- Identification: IMO number: 7911210; MMSI number: 261146000; Callsign: SQKY
- Status: Active

General characteristics
- Class & type: Sail training ship
- Tonnage: 498 tonnes deadweight (DWT)
- Length: 47.00 m (154 ft 2 in)
- Beam: 8.00 m (26 ft 3 in)
- Draught: 3.65 m (12 ft 0 in)
- Propulsion: 945 m^{2} (10,170 sq ft) Sail and 255 kW (342 hp) Volvo Penta diesel engine
- Sail plan: Barquentine
- Complement: Up to 52

STS Pogoria is a Polish barquentine launched in 1980. She was designed by the naval architect Zygmunt Choreń as the first in a series of (18 total) middle and large-size contemporary sailing vessels.

== History ==
Pogoria had been designed (Zygmunt Choreń) for the explicit purpose of training and education of young (from 14 years of age) students in the high seas environment. It has classroom facilities and its rigging can be manually worked by male or female crew of the junior high school age. It has also proved to be highly seaworthy, sailing throughout its history all (including Antarctic) seas in often heavy conditions. In addition, it is highly competitive in races, routinely ranking at top places during the tall ship race events.

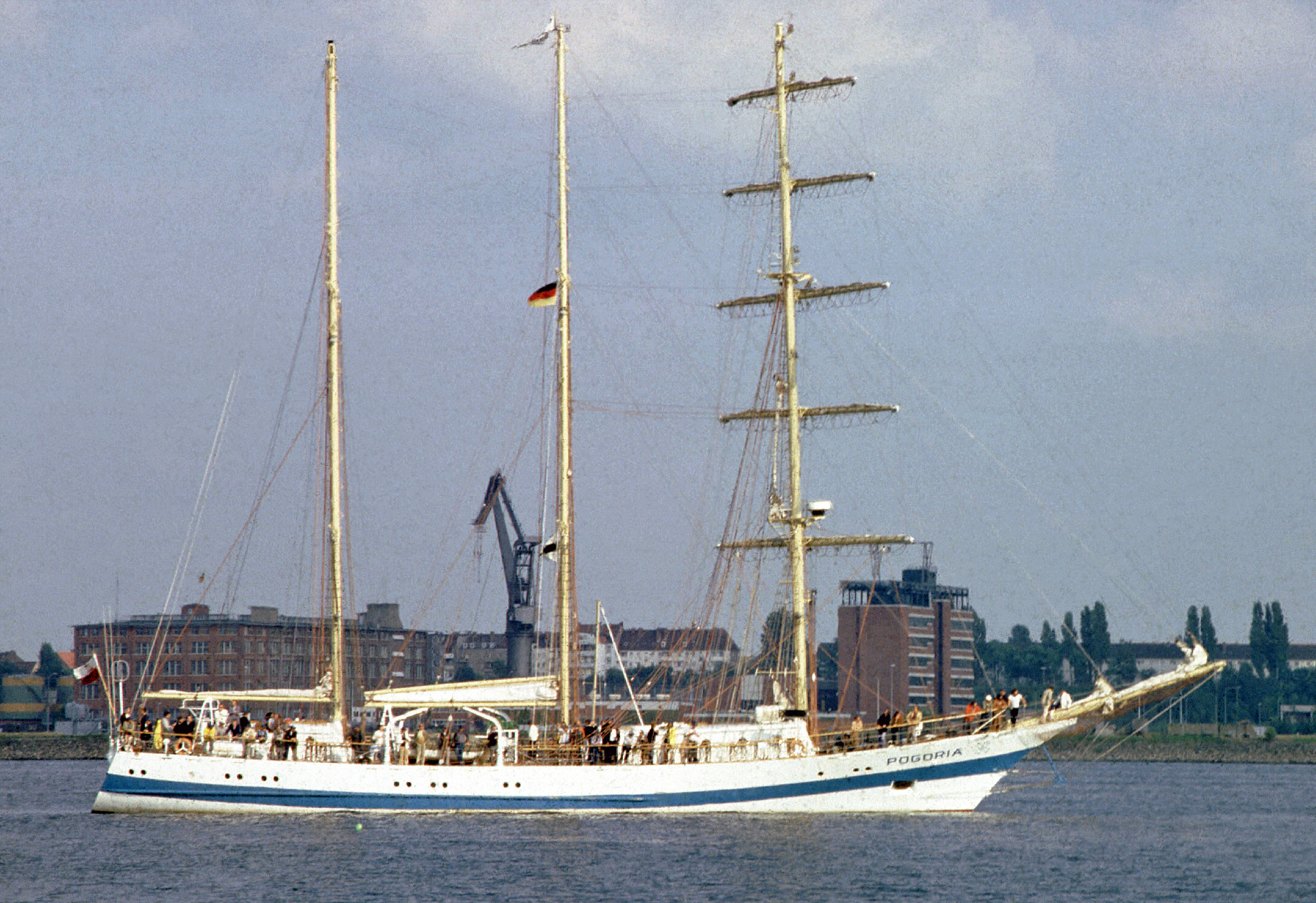
Pogoria 1982 in Kiel)

Pogoria had been launched from Gdańsk Shipyard Jan 23 1980. Its main use is – as designed – education and training. Most crew rotations consist of junior and high school students in 1- to 8-week-long tours. The usual complement is ~6 professional officers and 40 students and volunteer teachers. The ship running duties (regular watches etc.) are being wholly filled by the youth crew, in addition to their regular school coursework. The fees are kept close to nominal level.

=== 2009 dismasting accident ===
On 7 July 2009, two of the masts on Pogoria broke at welded joints while the ship was en route to St Petersburg, Russia. The 37 youths on board were airlifted off the ship by two helicopters of the Finnish Border Guard's Aviation Unit. The ship was towed into Hanko as her engines were disabled in the incident.

== See also ==
- Joanna Pajkowska, a crew member on education trips
