= Odesa Maritime Academy =

Public university in Odesa, Ukraine

Coordinates: 46°29′01″N 30°42′51″E

- Одеська національна морська академія
- Established: 1944
- Accreditation: Ministry of Education and Science of Ukraine
- Rector: Mykhailo Miyusov
- Students: 8441
- Location: Odesa, Ukraine
- Campus: Urban
- Website: www.onma.edu.ua

The Odesa Maritime Academy (Ukrainian: Національний університет «Одеська морська академія») is a maritime university in Odesa, Ukraine. Currently, the main task of the university is to ensure the competitiveness of graduates in the Ukrainian and world labor markets, by training seafarers while taking into account the most demanding claims of leading shipowners.

Since Ukrainian independence, the university opened new specialties and created a network of separate structural units, in particular in the cities of Mariupol and Izmail . The staff is working to improve the organization and content of the educational process. NU "OMA" has a modern material and technical base, with modern naval simulators, a large library, and a unique training and sailing vessel called "Druzhba". The university also has the facilities for physical culture and sports: an Olympic-class swimming pool, a sports gym, sports sections and a water station at the disposal of cadets and students.

== History ==
The Odesa Higher Maritime School was established on June 7, 1944. It was renamed the Odesa Higher Naval Engineering School in 1958 and Odesa State Maritime Academy in 1991, following Ukrainian independence. It became a national university and assumed the title Odesa National Maritime Academy in 2002 before finally assuming its current name in 2016.

Since 2014 the Odesa Naval College of the Ukrainian Navy - the ex-Nakhimov Naval Academy, which also trains officers of the Ukrainian Marine Corps especially since its separation from the Navy proper in 2023 - is under the supervision of the academy. It thus forms the academy's military division.

== Notable alumni ==
- Anatoli Khorozov – president of the Ice Hockey Federation of Ukraine.
- Pavel Prokudin - 3rd Prime Minister of Transnistria

== See also ==
- List of maritime colleges
