= Pallada (tallship) =

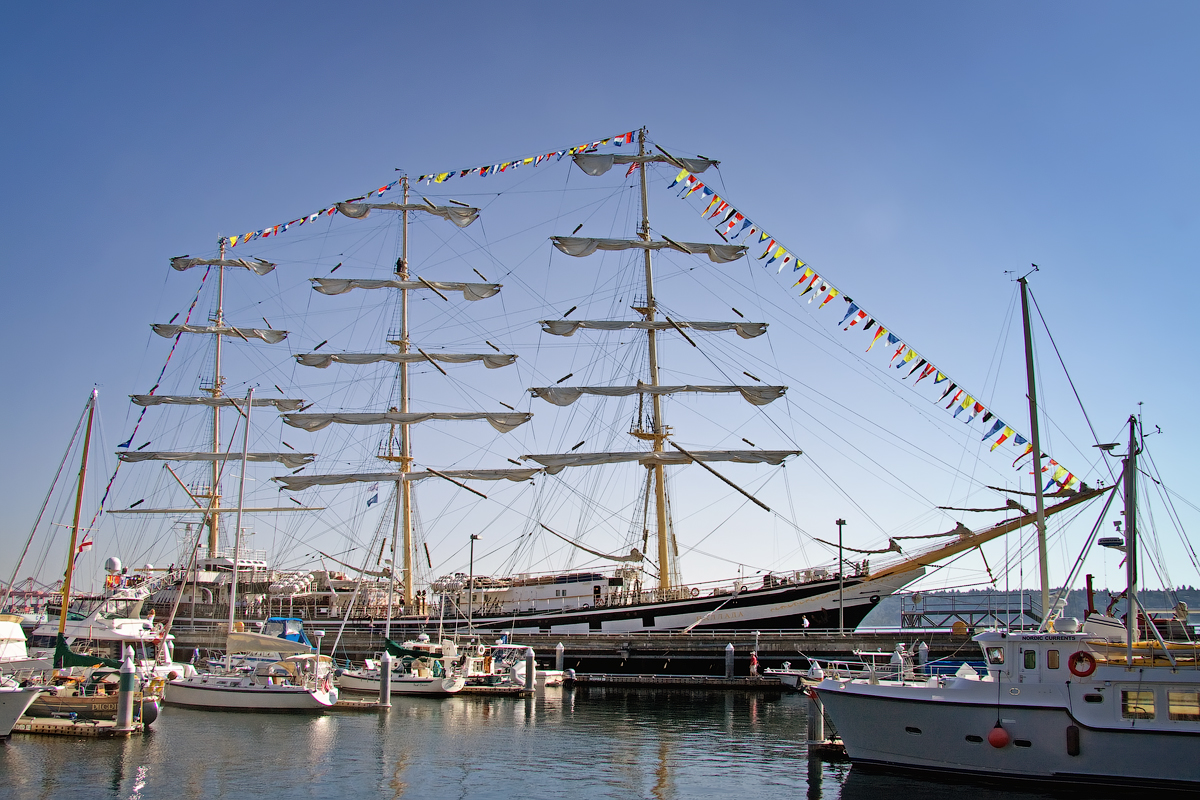
Pallada on a port visit to Seattle in August, 2011.

The tall ship Pallada (Russian: Паллада), designed by Polish naval architect Zygmunt Choreń, is a Russian 356.3 feet (108.6 m) long three-masted frigate. It is considered the world's fastest sailing ship, as it holds the world speed record of 18.7 knots in the Sail Training International largest and most prestigious Class A. There exists a claim that during the circumnavigation of 2007-2008, Pallada posted 18.8 knots, but this record still remains officially unrecognized.

Pallada arrived in Kodiak, Alaska, on July 20, 2011, and was welcomed by hundreds of people who lined the waterfront. The Kodiak visit was the first stop of a North Pacific tour.
