= Khersones (ship) =

Full-rigged ship from Crimea

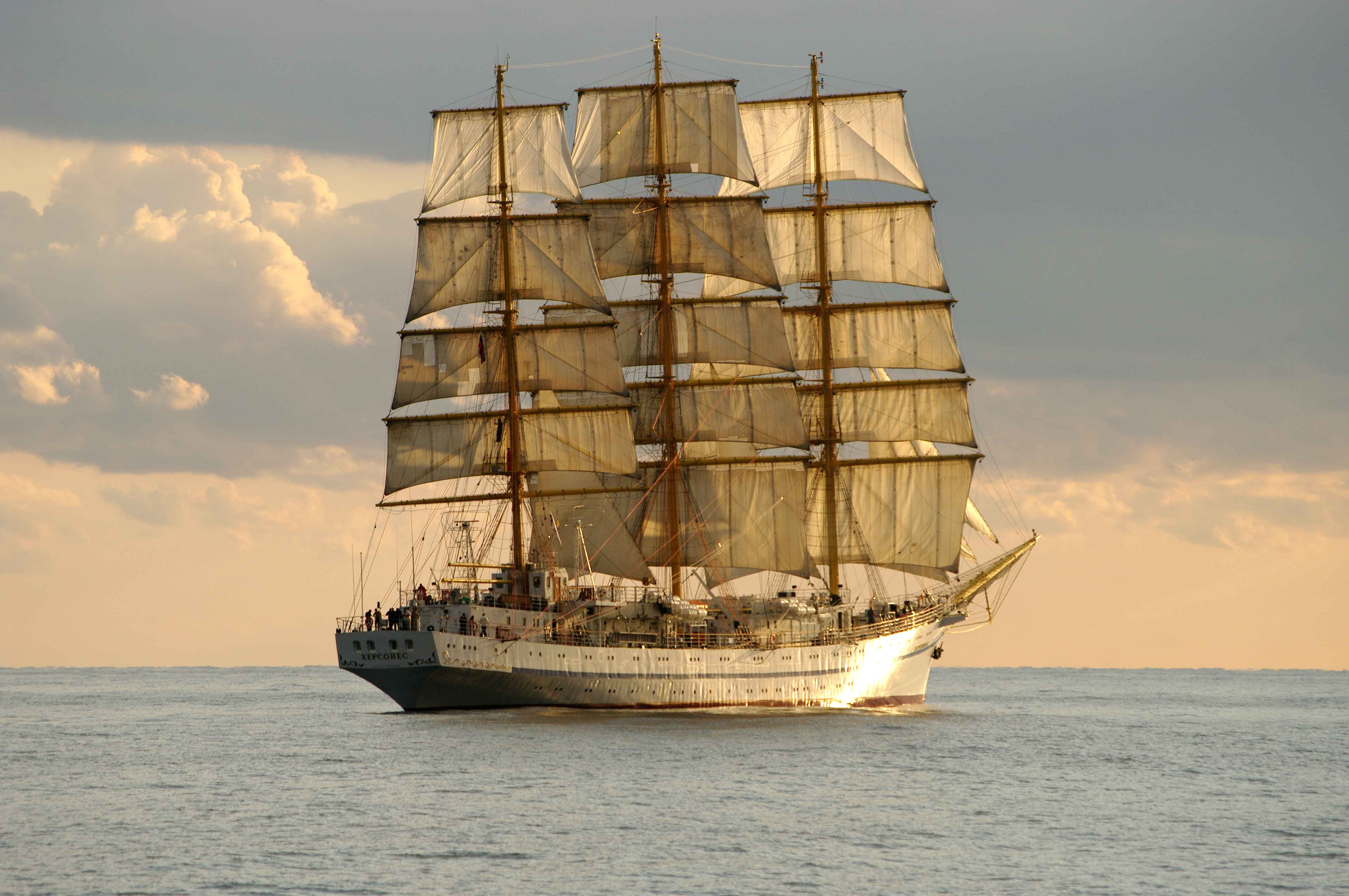
- Khersones near Sochi, 2016

History

Soviet Union
- Owner: PORP "Atlantic" (1989-1991); Kaliningrad State Technical University (1991)
- Builder: Vladimir Lenin Shipyard, Gdańsk
- Launched: 1989
- Home port: Kerch, Soviet Union
- Fate: Transferred to Ukraine
- Notes: Originally named Alexander Grin. Changed to Khersones to celebrate the 1000th anniversary of the Baptism of Rus

Ukraine
- Owner: Kerch State Marine Technology University; Inmaris Perestroika Sailing Maritime Services
- Commissioned: 1991
- Home port: Kerch, Autonomous Republic of Crimea, Ukraine
- Fate: Seized by Russia

Russia
- Owner: Federal Agency for Sea and Inland Water Transport
- Commissioned: 2014
- Home port: Sevastopol, Crimea
- Identification: Call sign: UEQS; IMO number: 8511835; MMSI number: 273389550
- Status: Active

General characteristics
- Class & type: Ukrainian Maritime Register Special Purpose Ship !A
- Length: 108.6 m (356 ft 4 in)
- Beam: 14 m (45 ft 11 in)
- Draft: 6.8 m (22 ft 4 in)
- Propulsion: sail, 2 × 1,000 hp (750 kW) auxiliary engines
- Sail plan: 3-masted ship rig; sail area 2,770 m^{2} (29,800 sq ft), 26 sails, height 49.5 m (162 ft)
- Complement: 42, including 2 teachers; 72 cadets; 91 trainees/passengers, max. 250 for day sails
- Notes: Speed under sail, 18 knots (33 km/h; 21 mph).; under power, 9 knots (17 km/h; 10 mph) .

Khersones or Chersones is a Crimean three-mast tall ship, a full-rigged ship. It was built in 1989 in Gdańsk Shipyard, Poland, in a series of six sister ships (among which also the Mir), after the designs of Polish naval architect Zygmunt Choreń. The ship is named after the city of Chersonesus an ancient city and archaeological site near Sevastopol.

She partakes in many windjammer regattas. In 1997, it became the first Ukrainian ship to sail around Cape Horn by only using her sails.

From 1991 to 2006 Khersones was a training ship for the Admiral Ushakov Maritime State University in Kerch, Crimea. At the same time, it was rented to the tourism company Inmaris Maritime Service GmbH as a cruise ship. This agreement was terminated in 2006 as Inmaris accused the Ukrainian side of refusing to pay for repairs that Inmaris had ordered, and to avoid an arrest on the vessel, it was then moved permanently to the docks in the Port of Kerch.

After the Russian occupation of Crimea in 2014, the ship was seized by Russian authorities. A dispute over control of the ship began between the Federal Agency for Fishery of Russia and the Ministry of Transport, with the Ministry gaining the upper hand with its subsidiary FGUP Rosmorport. In 2015 the ship traveled to the Sevastopol Shipyard for repairs, and later made its home port in the city due to the construction of the Crimean Bridge near Kerch. Khersones took part in "SCF Black Sea Tall Ships Regatta – 2016".

In 2021, Khersones was reprovisioned with scarlet sails, in reference to the book of the same name by Alexander Grin, taking part in the Tavrida-ART festival.

== See also ==
- List of large sailing vessels
