= Training ship =

Ship used to train seafarers

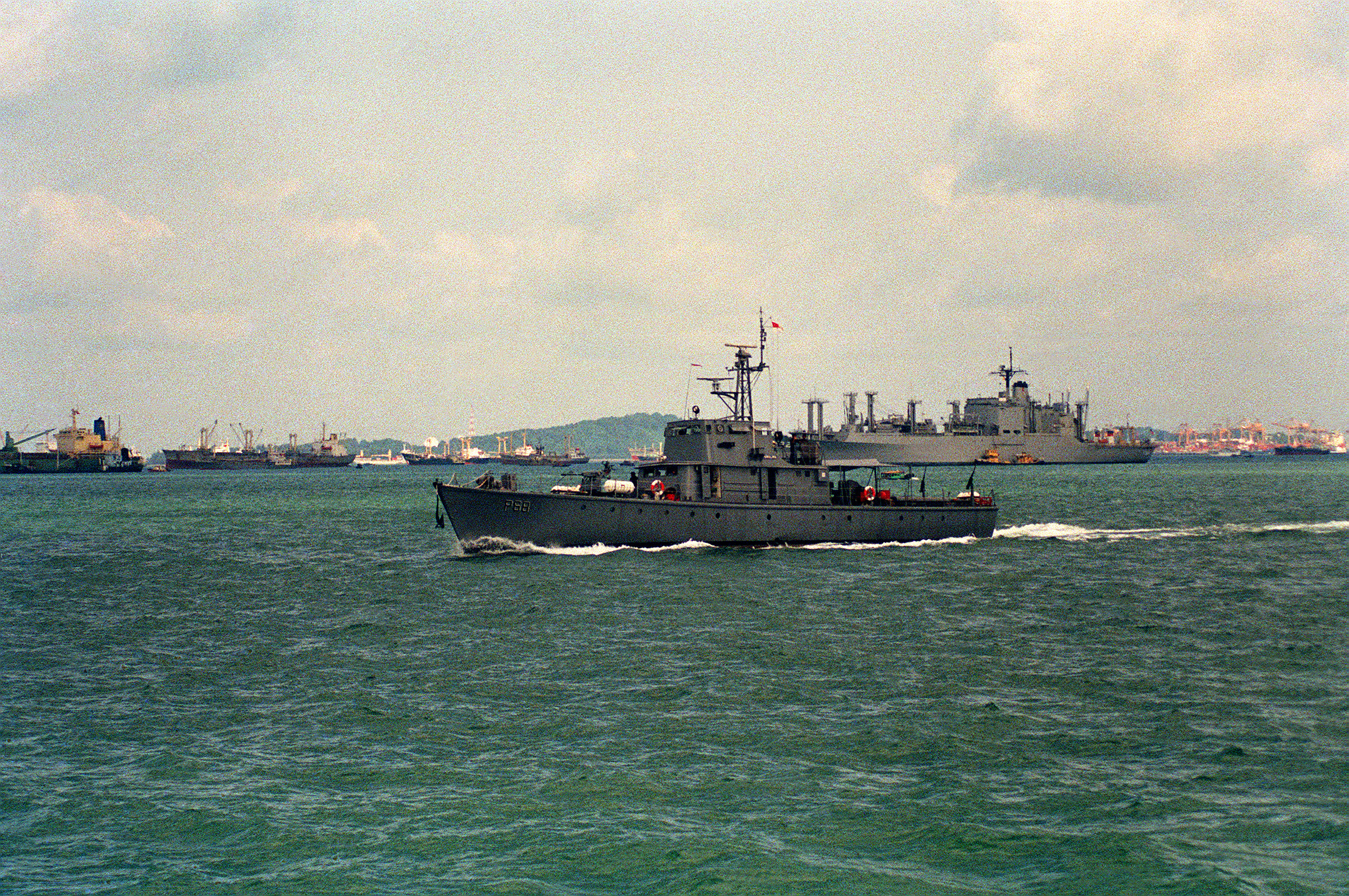
A port bow view of the Singapore training ship RSS Panglima

A training ship is a ship used to train students as sailors. The term is mostly used to describe ships employed by navies to train future officers. Essentially there are two types: those used for training at sea and old hulks used to house classrooms. As with receiving ships or accommodation ships, which were often hulked warships in the 19th century, when used to bear on their books the shore personnel of a naval station (as under section 87 of the Naval Discipline Act 1866 (29 & 30 Vict. c. 109), the provisions of the act only applied to officers and men of the Royal Navy borne on the books of a warship), that were generally replaced by shore facilities commissioned as stone frigates, most "Training Ships" of the British Sea Cadet Corps, by example, are shore facilities (although the corps has floating Training Ships also, including TS Royalist).

The hands-on aspect provided by sail training has also been used as a platform for everything from semesters at sea for undergraduate oceanography and biology students to character-building for youths.

== Notable training ships ==
=== Royal Navy ===
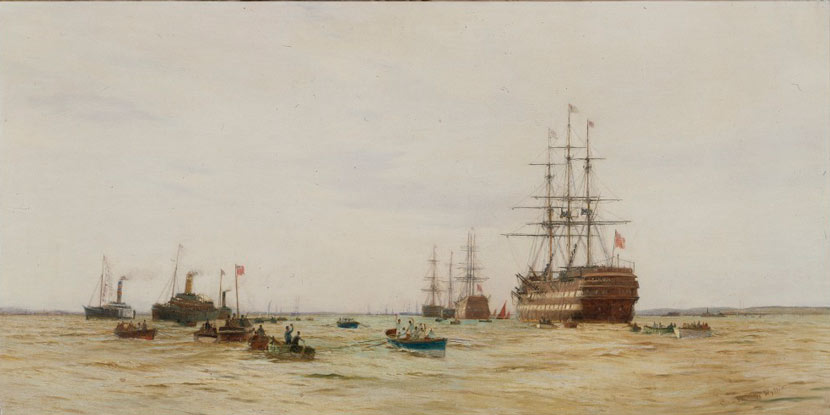
Painting of the first Mersey boat race between cadets of HMS Conway (on the right) and London's HMS Worcester on 11 June 1891. Also moored in line are reformatory ships Clarence (centre, furthest away) and Akbar, and TS Indefatigable.

- Arethusa (1849) from 1874 to 1933.
- Boscawen, a series of training ships from 1860 to 1906 (the original HMS Boscawen (1844) went on to serve as TS Wellesley from 1873 to 1914).
- Britannia, a series of two training ships from 1859 to 1905.
- Bristol (D23), a 1973 destroyer used for training from 1987 to 2020.
- Buzzard (1887) from 1904 to 1921 (renamed President in 1911).
- Castor (1832) from 1860 to 1902.
- Clio (1858) from 1876 to c.1919.
- Conway, a series of three training ships from 1859 to 1956, and then a shore-based school.
- Cornwall (see also Wellesley)
- Defiance (1861) from 1884 to 1931.
- Duncan (F80), a 1955 frigate used for training from 1969 to 1985.
- Eastbourne (F73), a 1957 frigate used for training from 1971 to 1985.
- Excellent, a series of three gunnery training ships from 1830 to 1892 before moving ashore.
- Exmouth (1905), the Royal Navy's first specially commissioned training ship; renamed HMS Worcester after 1945.
- Foudroyant (1798), training ship for gunnery from 1862 to 1884, and for boys from 1891 to 1897. See also Trincomalee.
- Ganges (1821) from 1865 to 1905; continuing renamed Tenedos III, Indus V and Impregnable III until 1923.
- Imperieuse from 1944 to 1948
- Implacable, formerly the French Duguay-Rouin (1800) renamed in 1805, from 1855 to c.1949.
- Impregnable, a series of training ships between 1862 and 1929
- TS Indefatigable, a series of two training ships from 1865 to 1941, including the former HMS Phaeton (1883).
- Kent (D12), a 1963 destroyer used for training from 1980 to 1993.
- Lion (1847) from 1871 to 1905.
- Mars (1848) from 1869 to 1929.
- TS Mercury, a naval training establishment founded as a ship in 1885.
- Mount Edgecumbe, formerly HMS Winchester (1822), renamed Conway (1861–76), used from 1876 to 1920.
- Northampton (1876) from 1894 to 1905.
- President (1829) from 1862 to 1903.
- Southampton (1820) from 1866 to 1912.
- Trincomalee (1817) from 1860 to 1903, continuing renamed TS Foudroyant until 1986.
- Warspite, a series of three training ships from 1862 to 1940.
- Wellesley (see also Cornwall and Boscawen).
- Worcester, a series of three training ships from 1862 to 1968.
- St Vincent (1815) from 1862 to 1905.

=== Other navies ===
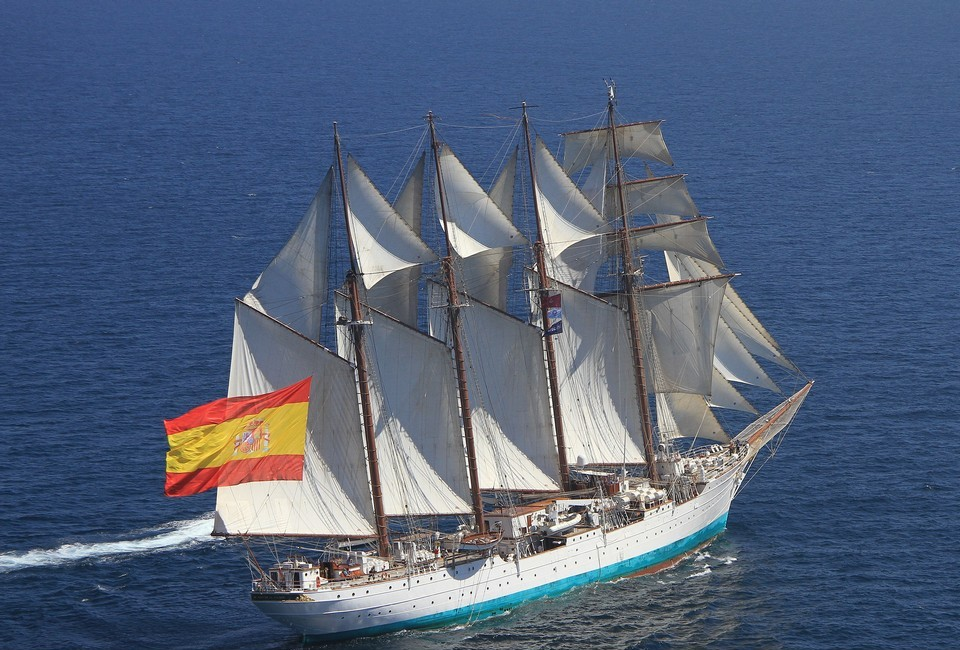
Juan Sebastián de Elcano sailing with the battle ensign in 2013

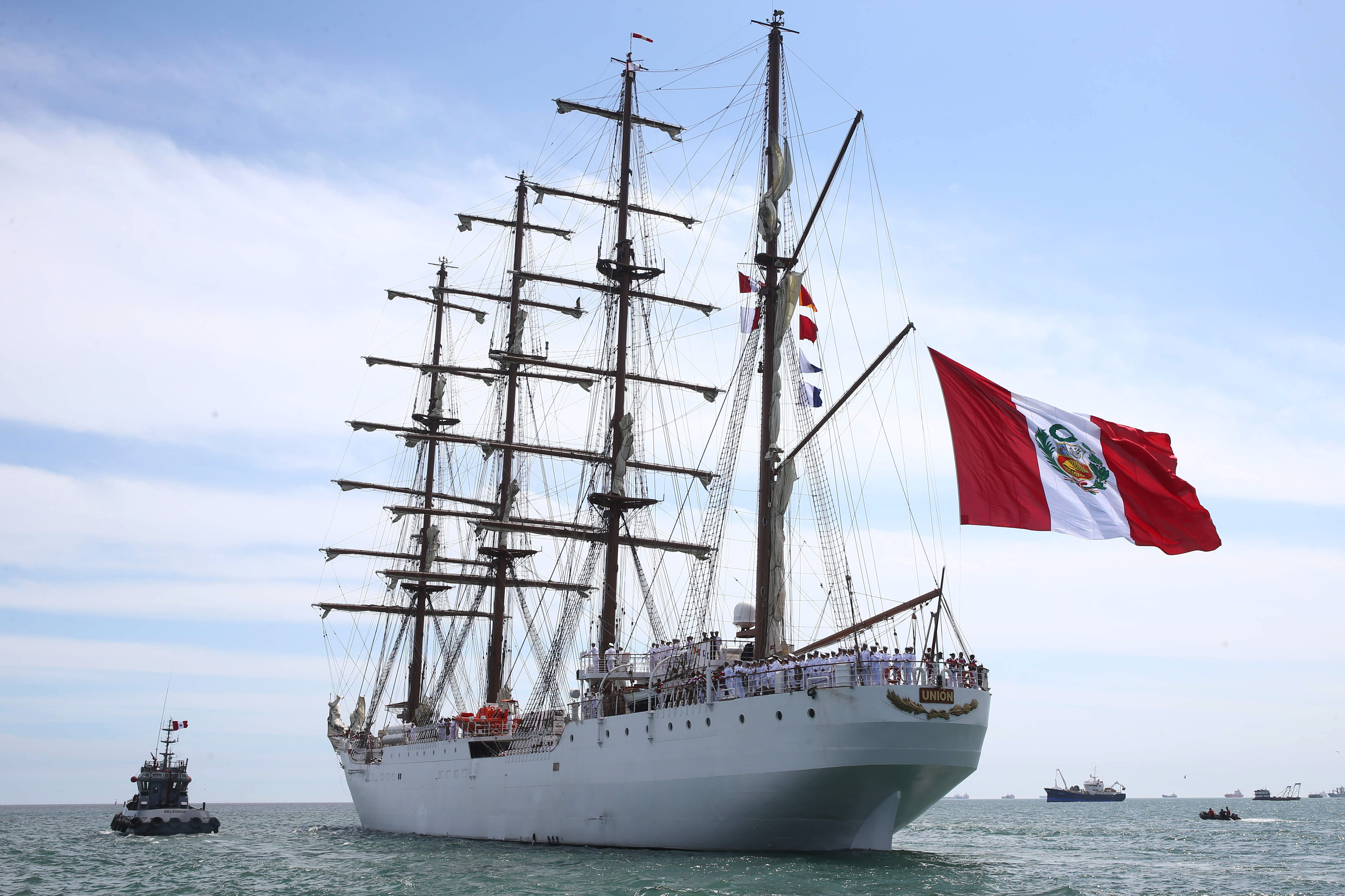
BAP Unión at Callao, in 2017

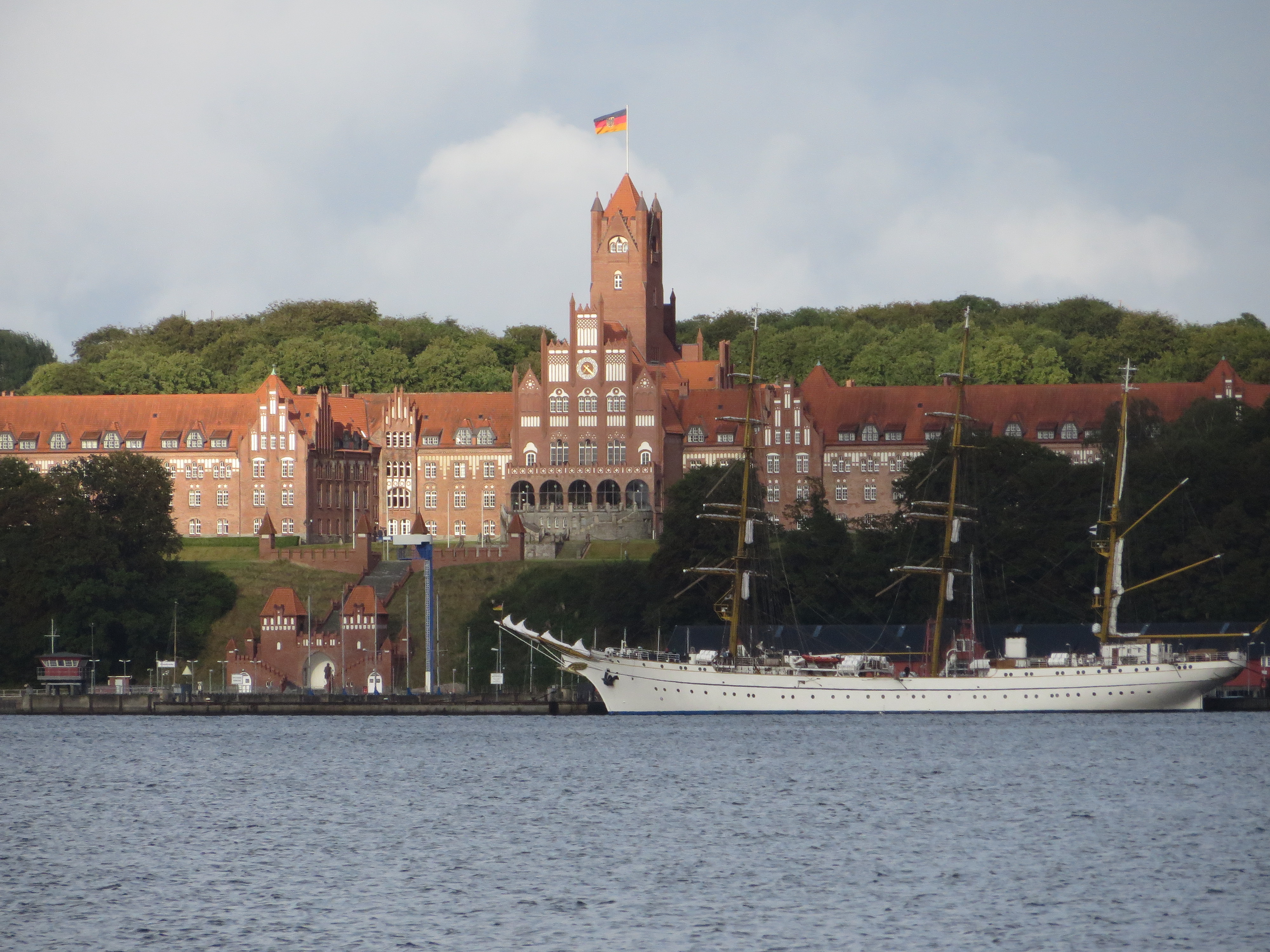
The second Gorch Fock in front of the Naval Academy Mürwik (Red Castle) in 2015

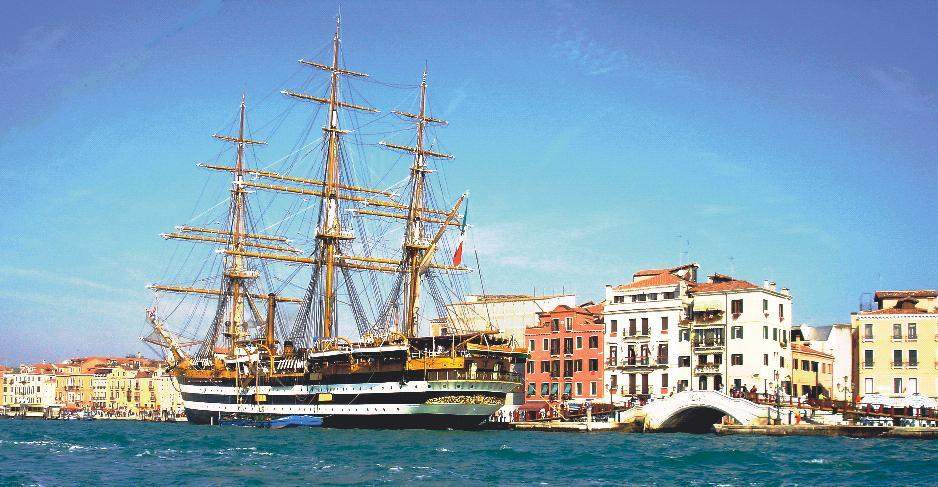
Amerigo Vespucci in Venice, 2006

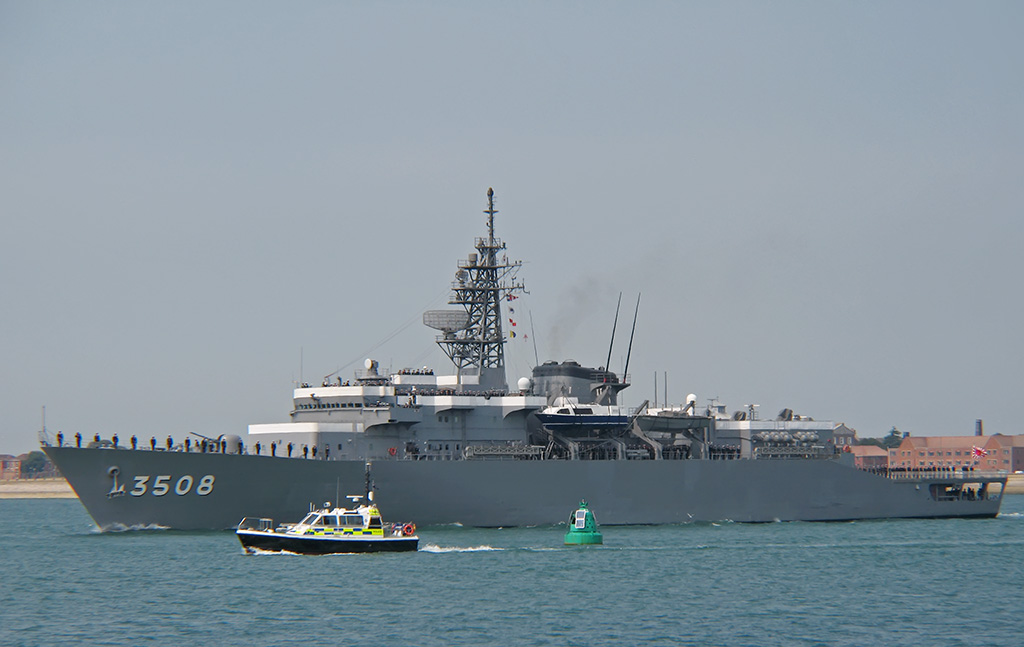
JS Kashima in Portsmouth, in 2008

- (Algeria) Algerian Navy
  - El-Mellah
- (Argentina) Argentine Navy
  - ARA Presidente Sarmiento
  - ARA Libertad
- Bangladesh Navy
  - BNS Shaheed Ruhul Amin
- (Brazil) Brazilian Navy
  - Cisne Branco
- (Bulgaria) Bulgarian Navy
  - Kaliakra
- (Canada) Royal Canadian Navy
  - Oriole (sail training)
  - HMCS Grisle
- (Chile) Chilean Navy
  - Esmeralda
- (China) Chinese People's Liberation Army Navy
  - Qi Jiguang
  - Zheng He
  - Brave the Wave-class
  - Liaoning
- (Colombia) Colombian Navy
  - ARC Gloria
- (Dominican Republic) Dominican Navy
  - Juan Bautista Cambiaso
- (Ecuador) Ecuadorian Navy
  - BAE Guayas (BE-21)
- (Finland) Finnish Navy
  - Suomen Joutsen
  - Pohjanmaa
- (France) French Navy
  - Jeanne d'Arc
- (Germany) German Navy
  - Gorch Fock (1933), of the Kriegsmarine
  - Gorch Fock (1958), of the Bundesmarine
- (India) Indian Navy
  - INS Sudarshini (A77), sail training ship commissioned in 2012.
  - INS Tarangini (A75), sail training ship commissioned in 1997.
  - INS Tir (A86), cadet training ship commissioned in 1986.
  - INS Varuna, sail training ship commissioned in 1981.
- (Indonesia) Indonesian Navy
  - KRI Dewaruci
  - KRI Arung Samudera
  - KRI Bima Suci
  - KRI Ki Hajar Dewantara
- (Republic of Ireland) Irish Naval Service
  - LÉ Setanta
- (Italy) Italian Navy
  - Amerigo Vespucci
  - Palinuro
- Japan Maritime Self-Defense Force
  - JS Kashima
- (Mexico) Mexican Navy
  - ARM Cuauhtémoc
- (Netherlands) Royal Dutch Navy
  - HNLMS Van Kinsbergen
  - HNLMS Urania
- New Zealand Navy
  - HMNZS Philomel
- Pakistan Navy
  - PNS Babur, formerly HMS Diadem (84), bought in 1956 and used for training from 1961 to 1963.
  - PNS Rah Naward, formerly Prince William (2001), bought in 2010.
- (Peru) Peruvian Navy
  - BAP Unión
- (Poland) Polish Navy
  - ORP Iskra
- (Portugal) Portuguese Navy
  - Dom Fernando II e Glória, 1843 frigate used for artillery training from 1865 to 1940.
  - Pedro Nunes, formerly the British clipper Thermopylae (1868), intended for training from 1896 but unused.
  - The second NRP Sagres
  - The third NRP Sagres
- (Romania) Romanian Navy
  - Mircea
- (Spain) Spanish Navy
  - Nautilus (1886 - 1925)
  - Galatea (1925 - 1982)
  - Juan Sebastián de Elcano (1928–Present)
  - Intermares (A-41) (2018–Present)
- (Sri Lanka) Sri Lankan Navy
  - SLNS Gajabahu
- Sweden
  - Altair-class training ship
- United States Navy
  - USS Constitution, of the United States Navy
  - USCGC Eagle, of the United States Coast Guard
  - USS Sable, of the United States Navy
  - USS Wolverine, of the United States Navy
- (Uruguay) Uruguayan Navy
  - Capitán Miranda
- (Vietnam) Vietnamese Navy
  - Le Quy Don
- (Venezuela) Venezuelan Navy
  - Simón Bolívar

=== Merchant fleet ===
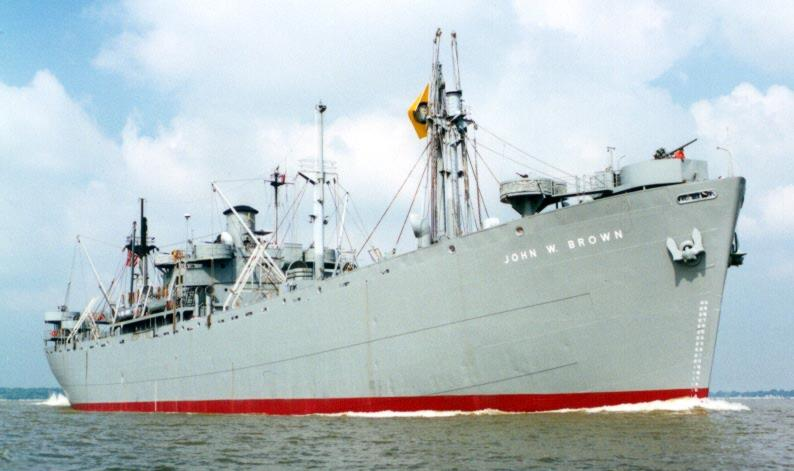
John W. Brown

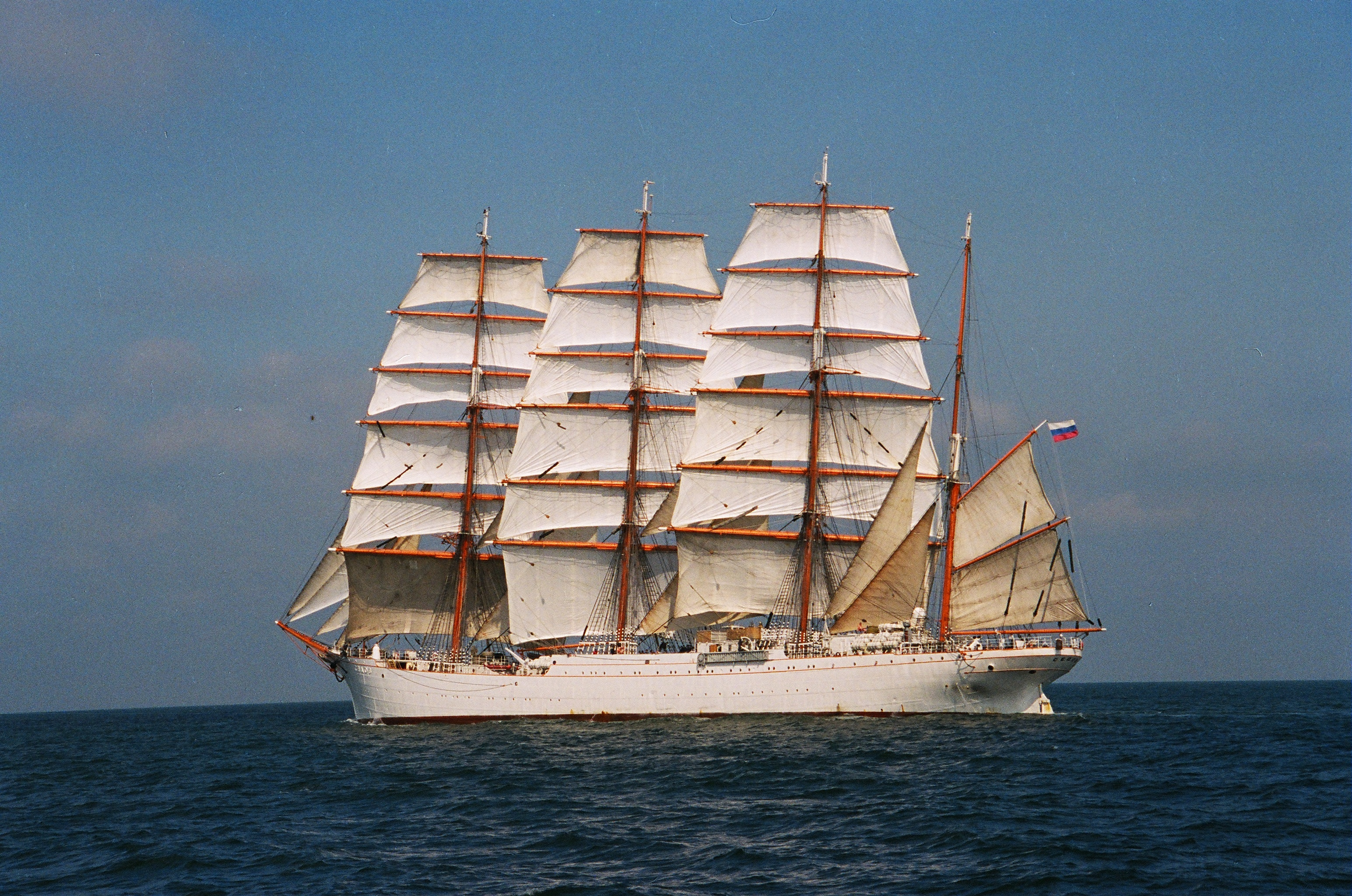
Sedov

- Cape Don
- Christian Radich, Norway
- Herzogin Cecilie, Germany
- Belem, France
- Kruzenshtern, Russia
- Khersones, Ukraine
- Kraljica Mora, Croatia
- Pamir, Germany, sunk 1957
- Passat, Germany
- STS Mir, Russia
- STS Sedov, Russia
- Sørlandet, Norway
- John W. Brown, USA
- John W. Brown II, USA
- Statsraad Lehmkuhl, Norway
- Danmark, Denmark
- TS Dolphin Leith, United Kingdom
- TS Dufferin (IMMTS Dufferin), British India
- TS Rajendra, India
- TS Chanakya, India
- TS Kapitan Felix Oca of the Maritime Academy of Asia and the Pacific
- TV Bluefin of the Australian Maritime College
- MV Stephen Brown, permanently moored vessel of the Australian Maritime College

==== United States Maritime Administration–owned training ships ====
- TS Kennedy (transferred from Massachusetts) of the Texas A&M University at Galveston
- TS Empire State VII of the SUNY Maritime College
- TS Golden Bear of the California State University Maritime Academy
- TS Patriot State II of the Massachusetts Maritime Academy
- TS State of Maine of the Maine Maritime Academy
- TS State of Michigan of the Great Lakes Maritime Academy
- T/V Kings Pointer of the United States Merchant Marine Academy
- T/V Liberator of the United States Merchant Marine Academy
- T/V Freedom Star T/V Freedom Star of the Paul Hall Center for Maritime Training and Education

=== Other sail training vessels ===
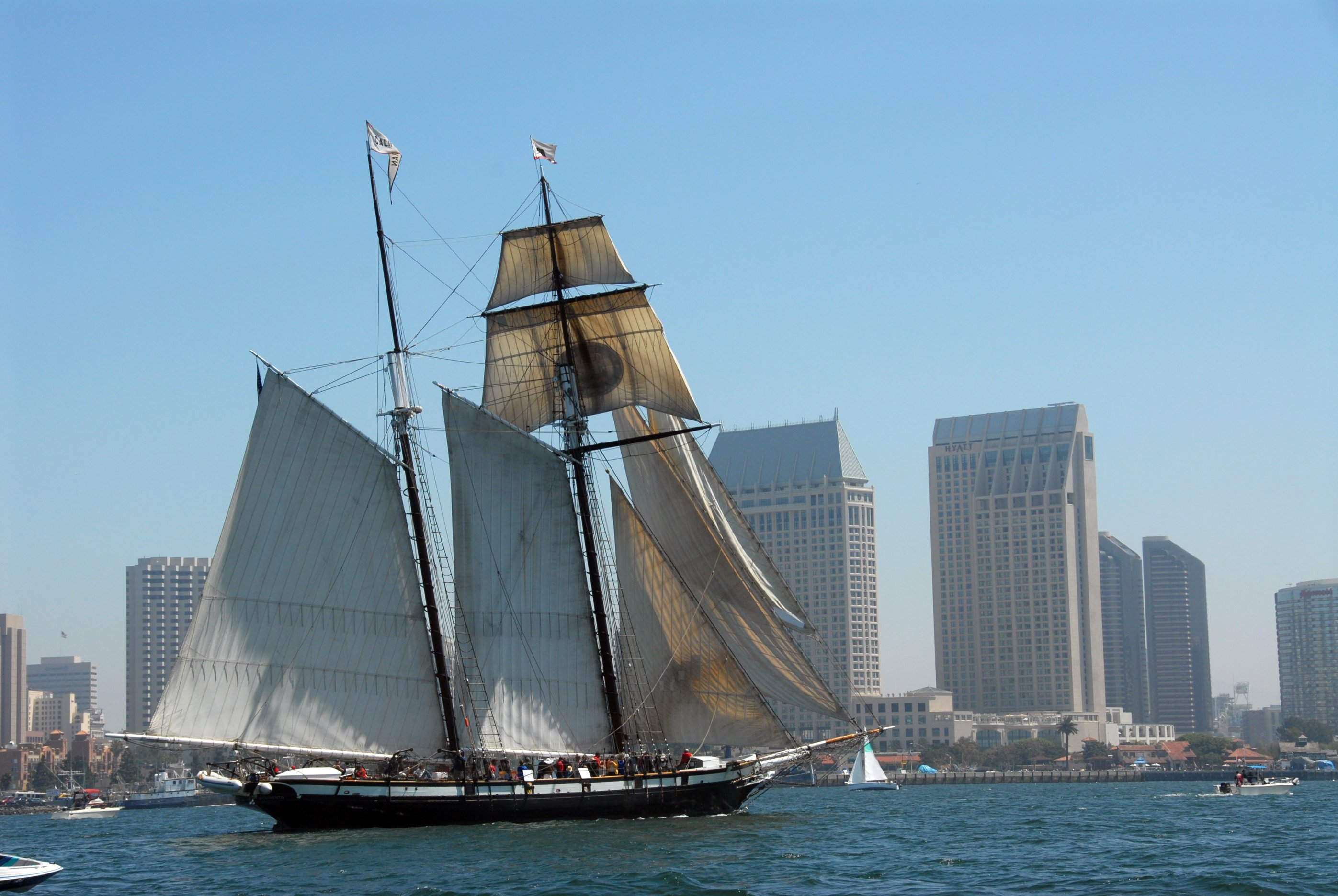
Californian in San Diego, California

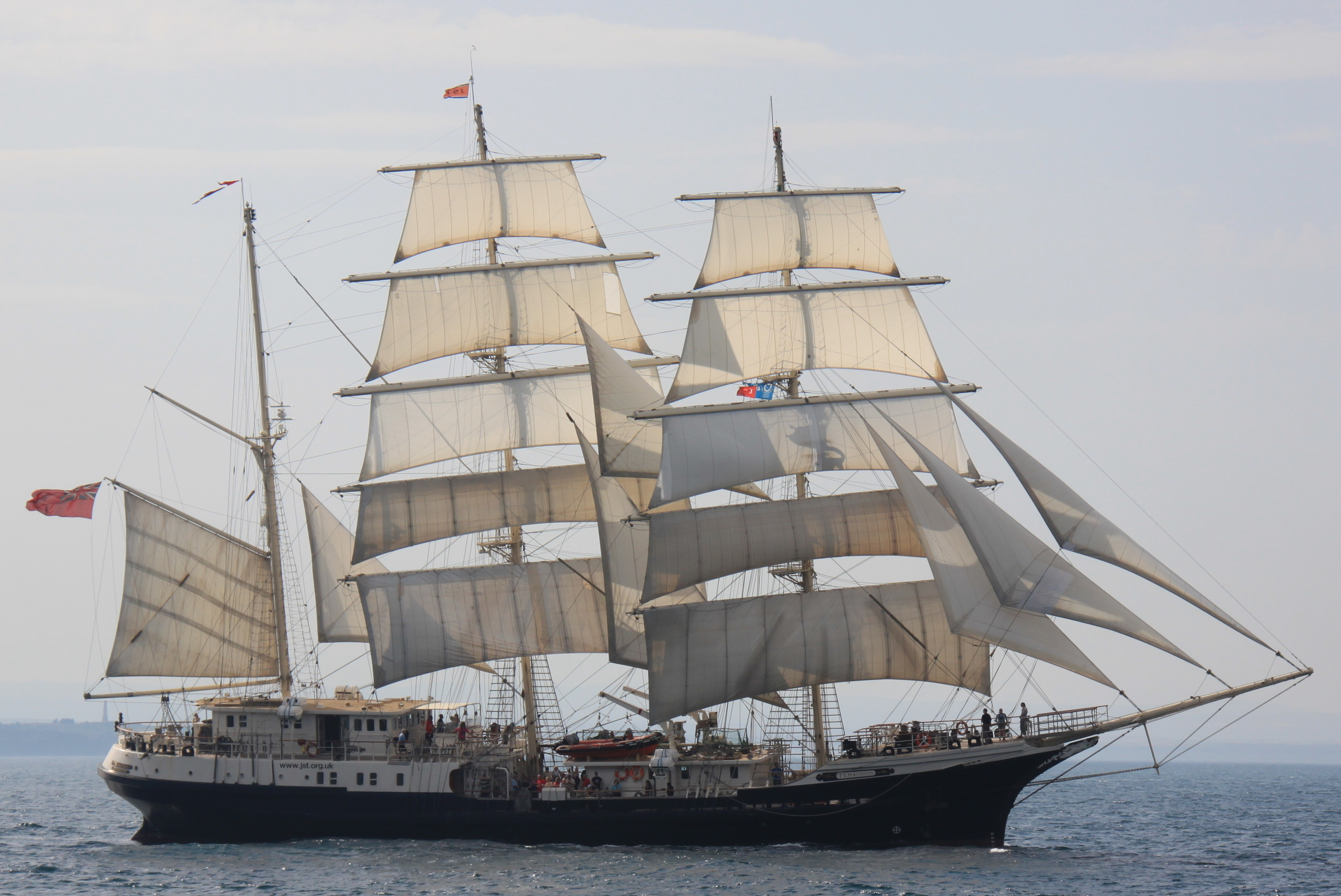
Tenacious in 2010, largest wooden ship built in the UK for over 100 years.

- Argo, schooner launched in 2006.
- Atyla, schooner launched in 1984.
- STV Black Jack, brigantine launched in 1904.
- Californian, launched in 1984.
- Christian Radich
- Dar Młodzieży
- Fryderyk Chopin
- Harvey Gamage, schooner launched in 1973.
- Irving Johnson and Exy Johnson, twin brigantines launched in 2002.
- Kaiwo Maru
- Kruzenshtern
- Lady Washington
- Malcolm Miller
- Nippon Maru
- Ocean Star, schooner launched in 1991.
- Pacific Swift
- Peking, 1911 barque used as TS Arethusa II from 1932 to 1940 and then 1945 to 1975.
- Pelican of London
- Picton Castle, former trawler (1928) converted to barque (1990s) for use 1997 onward.
- Pilgrim
- TS Royalist, a series of two ships launched in 1971 and 2014.
- Sir Winston Churchill
- Stavros S Niarchos
- Tenacious, barque launched in 2000.
- Tole Mour
- SSV Tabor Boy

== In fiction ==
- PRS James Randolph, an interplanetary spacecraft parked in Earth orbit in Robert A. Heinlein's novel, Space Cadet.
- Betty Jeanne, in the novel Fergus Crane by Paul Stewart and Chris Riddell.
- The anime series Girls und Panzer makes use of an overblown application of the term "school ship" by introducing carrier-type vessels supporting federal schools and accompanying living communities.

== See also ==
- Moored training ship (MTS)
- Stone frigate
