= Stavros Niarchos (disambiguation) =

Stavros Niarchos may refer to:

- Stavros Niarchos (1909–1996), Greek shipping magnate
- Stavros Niarchos III, Stavros Niarchos's grandson and an heir
- Stavros S Niarchos, a British brig-rigged tall ship

== See also ==
- Stavros Niarchos Foundation
- Stavros Niarchos Foundation Cultural Center
