= Royalist (disambiguation) =

Royalist refers to a supporter of a particular monarch.

Royalist may also refer to:

- Royalist (Spanish American Revolution)
- The Royalist, 1682 comedy play
- HMS Royalist, several Royal Navy ships
- The Royalist, schooner
- TS Royalist, sail training ship
- Royalists (French Socialist Party), supporters of Ségolène Royal
- The Cavaliers, also referred to as the Royalists, the party supporting the King during the English Civil War
- A student of Royal College, Colombo
