= Queen of the Sea =

Queen of the Sea may refer to:

== Transport ==
- cruise ship nickname
- ocean liner nickname
- Queen of the Sea (ship) a tall ship
- 2004 Sri Lanka tsunami train wreck, a wreck caused by the 2004 Boxing Day tsunami of the train service Queen of the Sea Line
- Samudra Devi (Sinhala: සමුද්‍ර දේවී; literally Queen of the Oceans), daily train service in Sri Lanka
- Merchants and Miners Transportation Company ships

== Film ==
- Queen of the Sea (film) 1918 U.S. fantasy film
- Queen of the Seas (1968 film) Italian adventure film

== See also ==
- Queen of the Ocean (disambiguation)
