= TS Royalist (1971) =

Name of two British vessels

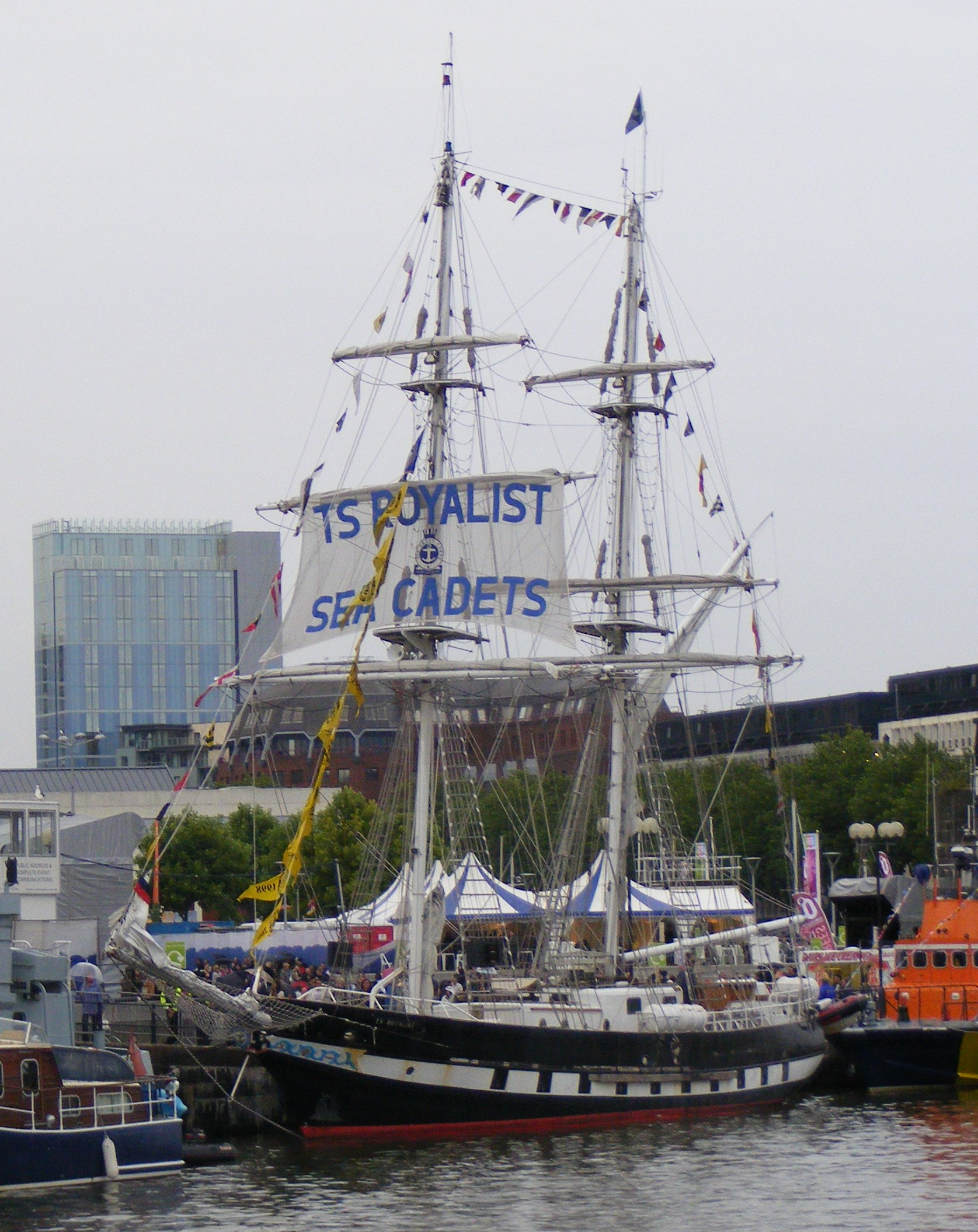
- TS Royalist at the Bristol Harbour Festival 2009

History
- Name: Royalist
- Owner: The Marine Society & Sea Cadets (MSSC)
- Operator: Sea Cadets Offshore Office
- Port of registry: (United Kingdom) Portsmouth Harbour
- Builder: Groves & Gutteridge, Cowes
- Launched: 3 August 1971
- Decommissioned: 20 November 2014
- Identification: IMO number: 1003530; MMSI number: 235004308; Callsign: MROR

General characteristics
- Class & type: Class A. Sail Training Vessel
- Tonnage: 83 GRT
- Length: 29.52 m (96 ft 10 in) overall; 23.32 m (76 ft 6 in) hull length
- Installed power: 2 Perkins Diesel engines, 101 kilowatts (135 hp) each, driving twin screw propellers
- Sail plan: Brig
- Complement: 8

TS Royalist is the name of two vessels. The original was a brig launched in 1971 and owned and operated as a sail training ship by the Marine Society & Sea Cadets of the United Kingdom. At the end of her service she was replaced by a new vessel bearing the same name.

== Description ==
Royalist is 83 GRT and her hull is 23.32 metres (76 ft 6 in) long, with an overall length of 29.52 metres (96 ft 10 in). As well as her sails, she is equipped with two Perkins diesel engines of 110 kilowatts (150 hp) each. The engines drive twin screw propellers.

== History ==
Royalist was built by Groves and Guttridge, East Cowes, Isle of Wight. She was designed by Colin Mudie RDI and launched on 3 August 1971 by Princess Anne. In 1992, Royalist was taken out of the water for a refit, termed as a "Mid-Life Upgrade". Royalist was re-launched by Princess Anne, (now the Princess Royal). Built of steel, with an overall length of 29 metres (97 feet) (including the bowsprit, which adds about 6 metres to the overall length), the ship has a traditional square-rigged brig layout. Royalist took part in the Thames Diamond Jubilee Pageant in June 2012, and Brest International Festival of the Sea the following month. Royalist was decommissioned at Portsmouth in November 2014, pending arrival of a replacement of the same name in Spring 2015.

== Crew ==
Almost every week of the year, 24 Sea Cadets, Combined Cadet Forces (CCF) and a single week of Air Cadets from all over the UK, join the ship and spend the week on board working as part of the crew. Many different parts of the UK & France are visited, sailing from her home berth in Gosport to Southampton, Poole, Cherbourg, St Helier, Brest and the Isle of Wight.

There are 8 permanent members of crew who instruct the embarked cadets on a weekly basis and also carry out the maintenance/winter refit. These are the Captain, Sailing Master, Engineer, Coxswain, Boatswain, cook and 2 watch officers (adult supervisors) and for longer trips like tall ships races they also embark a Third watch Keeper.

== Incidents ==
On 20 May 1996, Royalist ran aground in the River Severn some 3 nautical miles (5.6 km) north of the Severn Bridge near Oldbury Power Station. Twenty cadets were taken off by helicopter and lifeboat.

On 5 April 2009, Royalist ran aground in Chapman's Pool, Dorset (50°35′17″N 2°04′46″W). The Marine Accident Investigation Branch (MAIB) investigated the incident and found that the ship's Master had taken on too many tasks at once.

On the evening of 2 May 2010 a 14-year-old male Sea Cadet was fatally injured, following a fall from the rigging whilst furling sails when the ship was anchored in Stokes Bay, in the Solent. He was named the next day as Jonathan Martin. The MAIB opened an investigation into the accident. The report into the accident was published on 3 March 2011. It concluded that the cadet fell because he had unclipped his safety harness when trying to manoeuvre past a fellow cadet in order to go to the assistance of another cadet. This was contrary to standing instructions and his training. Two recommendations were made at the time of the incident by the MAIB. The supervision of cadets aloft was criticized and has since been dealt with by employing permanent Watch Officers to stay with the cadets at all times aloft. In April 2012, a Coroner's Inquest returned a verdict of misadventure.

== Opportunities ==
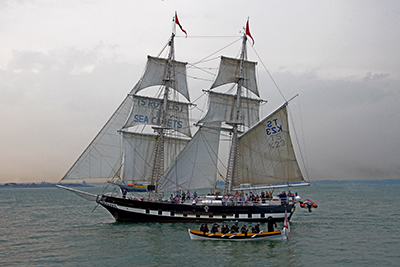
The TS Royalist during the Trafalgar 200 international fleet review

Trips are also taken abroad regularly, such as to the Channel Islands and to France, Belgium and in some cases, the Netherlands and Germany. Also, during the Tall Ships race period, 'Royalist' can visit other countries of Europe. She is also a guest at Brest Festival, FR.

For around four or five weeks of the year, for The Tall Ships' Races, Royalist becomes a racing ship. During this period, only cadets who are over 16 years of age are allowed to crew her. This period usually involves a crew taking her to the start of the race (1 week duration). Then, the race crew come on board, and race 'Royalist' against other Class A ships in the race, which are from all over the world (2 week duration). When the race finishes, yet another crew come aboard, and bring her back home (2 week duration).

Cadets can gain various qualifications when they complete a week on board TS 'Royalist'. Mainly Offshore Hand 1 and Offshore Hand 2. Later qualifications such as Offshore Seaman, and Offshore Watch leader are usually held by Cadets with experience on board the Royalist, but it is generally required, especially for Offshore Watch Leader, that Cadets wishing to gain these qualifications also have experience on board the Yachts TS 'Vigilant' or the sister TS 'City Liveryman'.

Voyages aboard the Royalist, Vigilant and City Liveryman can count towards RYA qualifications such as day skippers.

== Replacement ==
On 26 July 2013 a £4.8 million contract was awarded to Spanish shipyard Astilleros Gondan S.A and designers Acubens, to build the Sea Cadets' new 21st Century flagship which will take thousands of cadets on offshore voyages. The replacement - also called TS Royalist was launched on 19 December 2014, and entered service in the spring of 2015.

The innovative design offers greater use of space, with better all-round sailing ability and performance. Faster and easier to handle than Royalist, the new ship will also be more economical to run. This makes it ideal for offering young people offshore sailing, helping them to learn greater seamanship and sailing skills. The ship is expected to be in service for 40 years.

== Races ==
In 2025, TS Royalist competed in the tall ships race (le Havre-Dunkirk and Dunkirk-Aberdeen). she had two different crews for the two different legs. for the le Havre to Dunkirk race they came 2nd in class. The crew also won best in crew parade in Le Havre before the races began. For the Dunkirk to Aberdeen crew the came 4th in the race. each crew was on board for 2 weeks. and photos can be seen on the sea cadets offshore Instagram page.

== See also ==
- The Marine Society
  - Sea Cadets
- Jubilee Sailing Trust
  - Lord Nelson
  - Tenacious
- Tall Ships Youth Trust
  - Stavros S Niarchos
- Trafalgar 200
