= Malcolm Miller =

Malcolm Miller may refer to:

- Malcolm Miller (schooner)
- Malcolm Miller (basketball) (born 1993), American professional basketball player
- Mac Miller (1992–2018), stage name of American rapper and singer Malcolm James McCormick
