= Sail and Life Training Society =

Christian organisation in Victoria, BC

Coordinates: 48.42939°N 123.37307°W

S.A.L.T.S. Sail and Life Training Society
- Founded: 1974
- Purpose: Sail Training
- Location: Victoria, British Columbia
- Region served: British Columbia
- Key people: Loren Hagerty; Executive Director; David Eggert; Director of Development
- Revenue: $3.3 million in 2012
- Website: http://www.salts.ca/

The Sail and Life Training Society (SALTS), founded in 1974, is a non-profit Christian organization based in Victoria, British Columbia. SALTS provides sail training and life lessons for 1,700 young people each year on tall ships and provides a valued link to the area's maritime heritage. Currently, SALTS administrative offices are located on Herald Street in downtown Victoria, with a shop space located nearby in the Rock Bay area.

== Programs ==
Young people ages 13–23 are given the experience of learning to sail a tall ship, which the organization describes as "life-changing." In addition to learning a large set of sailing skills, they face fears (for example when climbing the rigging 115’ in the air on a moving ship) and learn teamwork, responsibility and interpersonal skills, which results in increased confidence. A bursary program is offered with help from other group partners, to make the program affordable to young people who are at risk, in low income households, or experiencing challenging life situations.

In the spring and fall, 4- and 5-day group sails are made with school and community groups. Ship Point Wharf in Victoria, British Columbia is the start and end point to the trips that travel through the Gulf Islands. 10-day summer sails circumnavigate Vancouver Island, sail along the central coast of British Columbia and the Great Bear Rainforest, and explore Haida Gwaii.

In the past, offshore voyages to ports around the world were held, where youth participated in selected legs of the journey. Due to new Canadian regulations for offshore vessels which the current tall ships do not meet, these trips are on hold until a new schooner is completed. All progress on the New Schooner Project can be followed along on their website.

Group programs are offered with over 30 public and private schools, university programs, and youth groups bringing 20 - 30 young people and their adult chaperones.

Day sails are also made available to interested sailors of all ages.

== Fundraising ==
SALTS is a registered Canadian charity. A large portion of program costs are funded through boat donations. SALTS arranges a third-party appraisal for the value of the tax receipt issued, and handles moorage, transportation and broker's fees.

== Ships ==
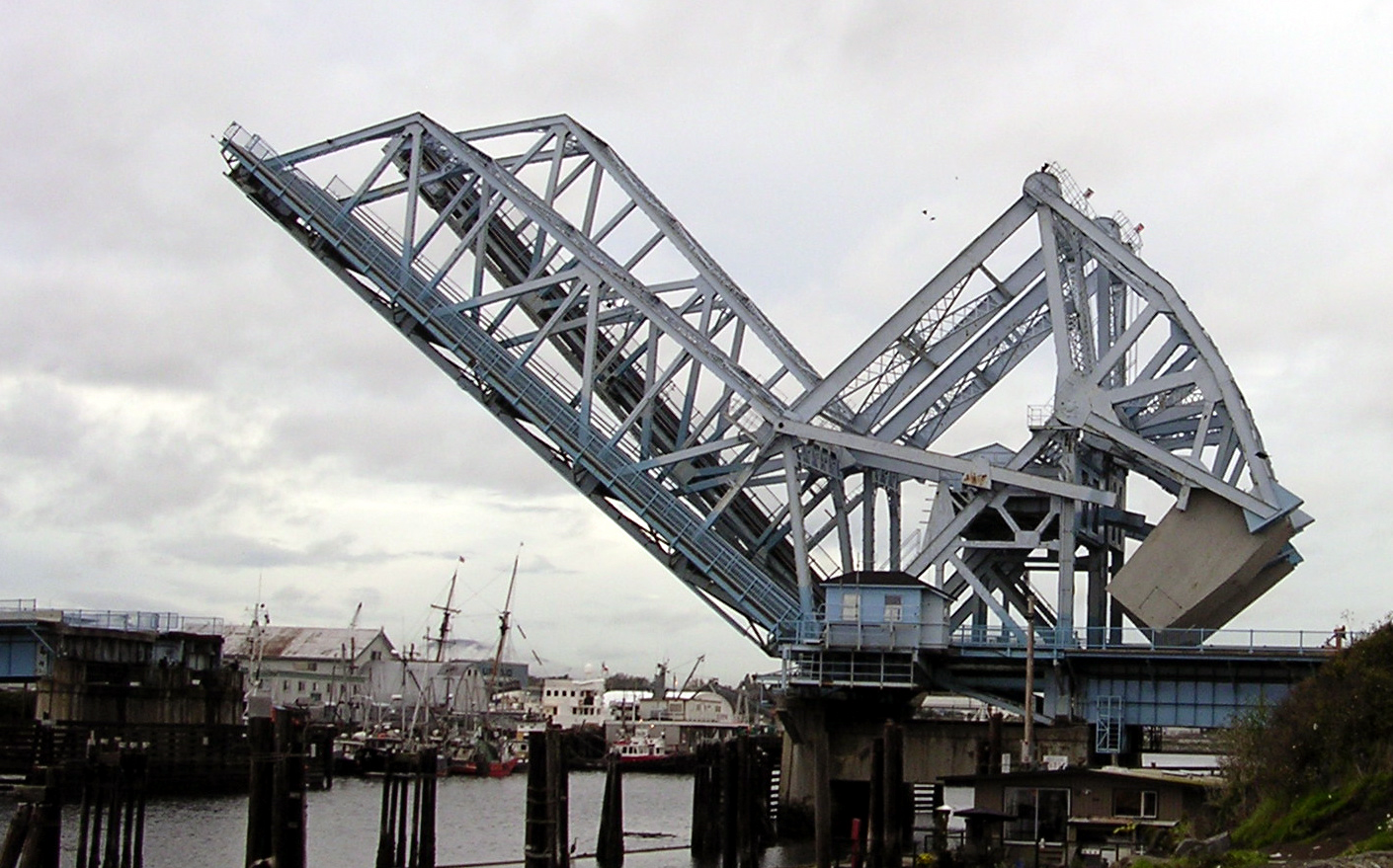
SALTS Heritage Shipyard above and below Victoria's Johnson Street Bridge (Pacific Swift in port)

SALTS owns, maintains and operates two traditional tall ships, Pacific Swift and Pacific Grace. Both were built by the Society in a shipyard at the former Coast Guard base on Victoria's Upper Harbour.

A new 116' Pilot Schooner the "Leonora" had been custom designed to be built for offshore voyages. As of September 2022, its construction was cancelled due to regulatory hurdles and inflation.

=== Pacific Swift ===
The wood hull of Pacific Swift was built as a working exhibit at Expo 86 in Vancouver, British Columbia. She is based on the brigantine Swift of 1778. The society had built another brigantine, Spirit of Chemainus, in 1985. Pacific Swift has made four off-shore voyages, which have included visits to Expo 88 in Australia and Expo 92 in Seville, to the West Indies and to the remote communities of Easter Island and Pitcairn Island. Pacific Swift has a total sail area of 510 sq m and weighs 71.45 gross tons.

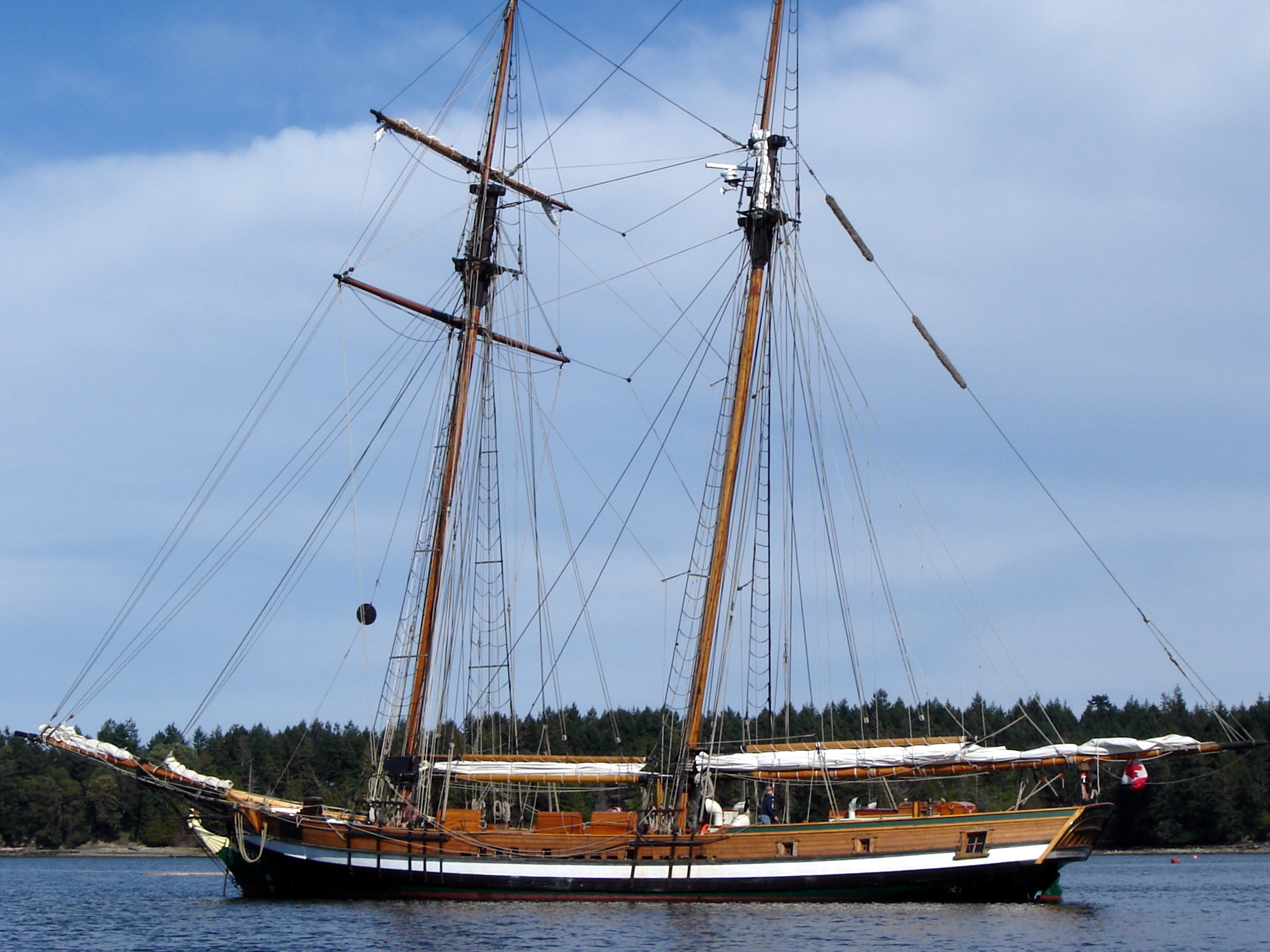
Pacific Swift

Characteristics
Sparred Length	111' or 34 m
Overall Length	81'
Beam	20' 6"
Draught	10' 6"
Displacement	98 Tonnes
Rig	Topsail Schooner
Accommodation	37 Berths
Coastal Complement	6 Crew, 30 Trainees
Offshore Complement	6 Crew, 21 Trainees

=== Pacific Grace ===
Pacific Grace was built at the S.A.L.T.S. Heritage Shipyard in Victoria, launched in October 1999 and commissioned in May 2001. Her total sail area is 740 sq m. and weighs a total of 94 gross tons. She is based on the Grand Banks fishing schooner Robertson II, one of the last fishing vessels to have been built in Canada which the society operated from 1974 to 1995. After two seasons of coastal sailing, she departed in September 2003 on her first offshore voyage: down the coast to Costa Rica, west to Galapagos and Pitcairn, and back through the Marquesas and the Hawaiian Islands. From June 2007 to June 2008, she made a longer voyage, to the South Pacific, calling at: Hawaii, Tahiti, Fiji, Vanuatu, Solomon Islands, Papua New Guinea, Guam, Okinawa, Shanghai, Osaka, Hawaii.

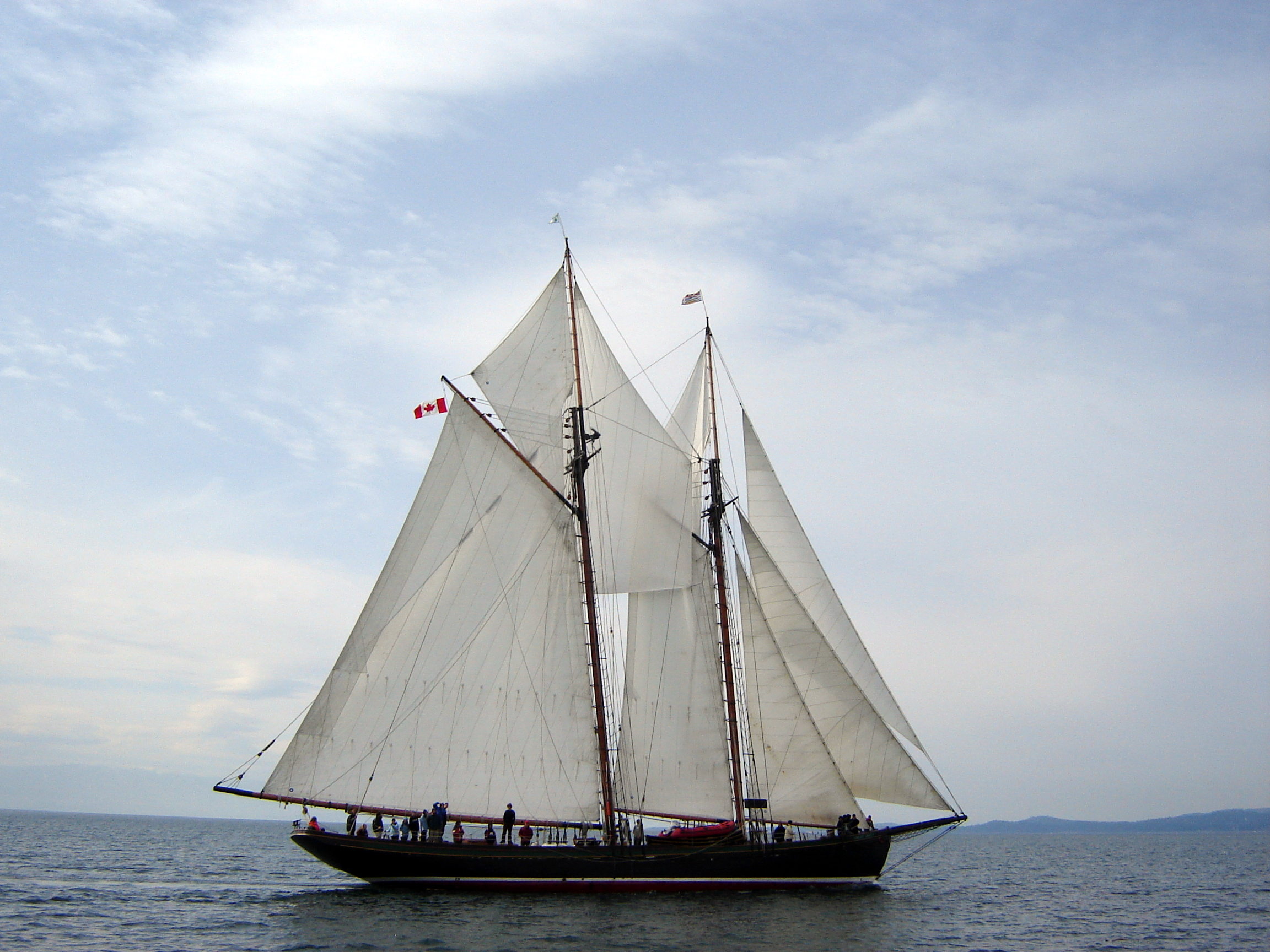
Pacific Grace

Characteristics
Sparred Length	138' 7" or 42 m
Overall Length	115'
Beam	22'
Draught	11' 6"
Displacement	175 Tonnes
Rig	Gaff Schooner
Accommodation	38 Berths
Coastal Complement	5 Crew, 31 Trainees
Offshore Complement	6 Crew, 24 Trainees

== Staff/Crew (2025) ==
Office and Shipyard Staff
Loren Hagerty	Executive Director
Svetlana Benger	Finance Manager
David Eggert	Boat Donation Manager and Relief Captain
John Andrachuk	Boat Sales Manager
Sam Vaale	Operations Manager
Tina Bergum	Communications and Development Manager
Sherilyn Thomson	Administration Manager
Dana Way	Booking Manager
Glynis Gittens	Registration Coordinator
Amanda Fisher	Communications and Admin Coordinator
Takayo Kono	Finance Coordinator
Patrick Sharman	Shop Foreman
Chris Barritt	Shoreside Support Manager
Ship's Captains
Tony Anderson	Master - Pacific Grace
Tristan Hedley	Master - Pacific Swift
