= TS Royalist =

TS Royalist may refer to either of two vessels:

- TS Royalist (1971), a sail training ship in service 1971–2014
- TS Royalist (2014), her replacement
