= Stavros S Niarchos =

British tall ship built in 2000

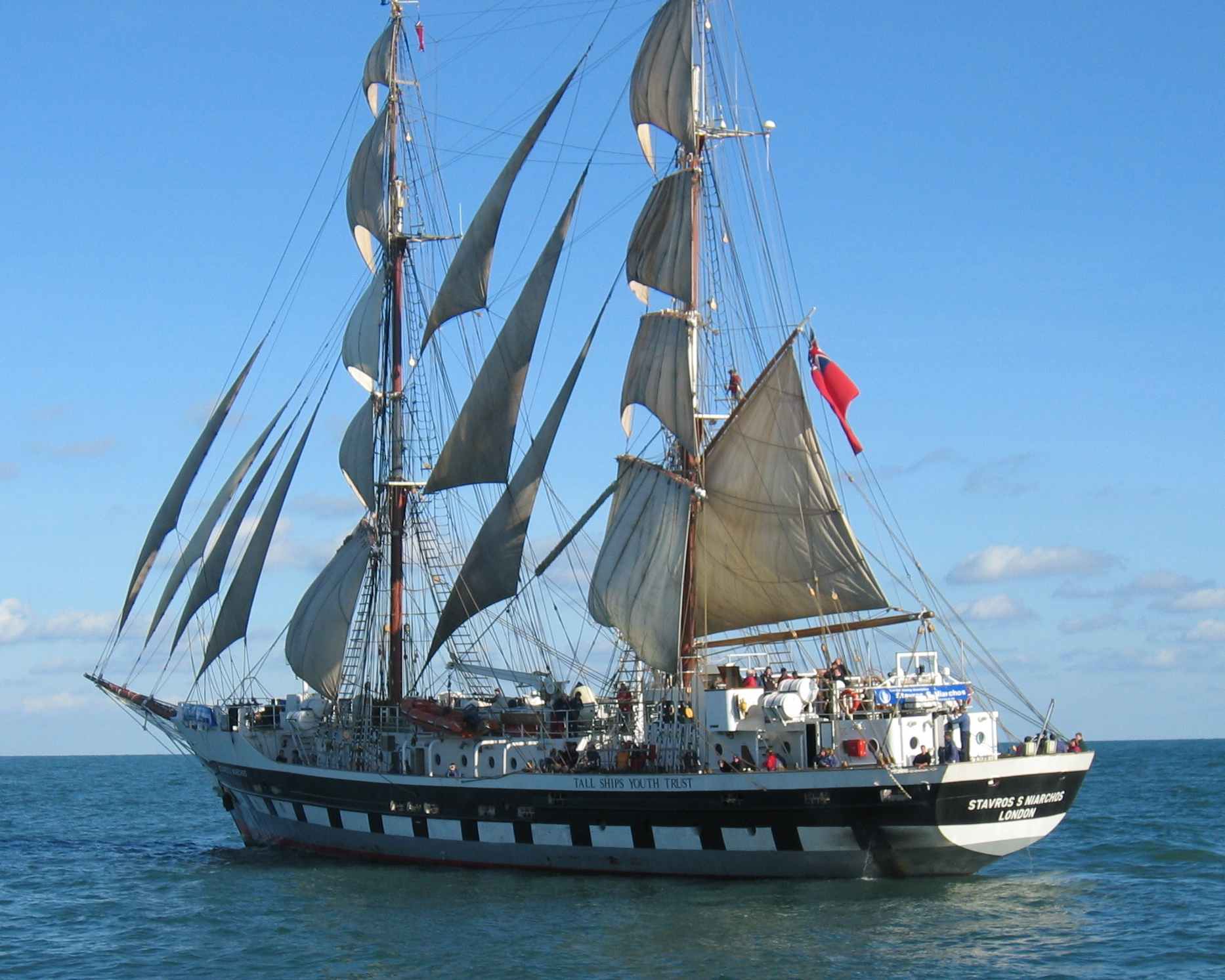
- Stavros S Niarchos under full sail off the Isle of Wight October 2003

History

United Kingdom
- Owner: Tall Ships Youth Trust
- Builder: Appledore Shipyard
- Completed: January 2000
- Identification: IMO number: 9222314; MMSI number: 232007330; Callsign: MZIU7
- Status: Active as of 2018

General characteristics
- Tonnage: 493 GT 198 NT
- Displacement: 635 tons
- Length: 59.4 m (195 ft) (LOA) 40.6 m (133 ft) (LWL)
- Beam: 9.9 m (32 ft)
- Draft: 4.5 m (15 ft)
- Installed power: 2 × MTU 330 kW (440 hp)
- Sail plan: Brig; Sail Area: 1,162 m^{2} (12,510 sq ft)
- Speed: 13 knots (24 km/h; 15 mph) (sail); 10 knots (19 km/h; 12 mph) (power)
- Range: 1,500 nmi (2,800 km; 1,700 mi) at 7 knots (13 km/h; 8.1 mph)
- Complement: 67 (6 salaried, 11 volunteers, 48 trainees, 2 supernumeraries)

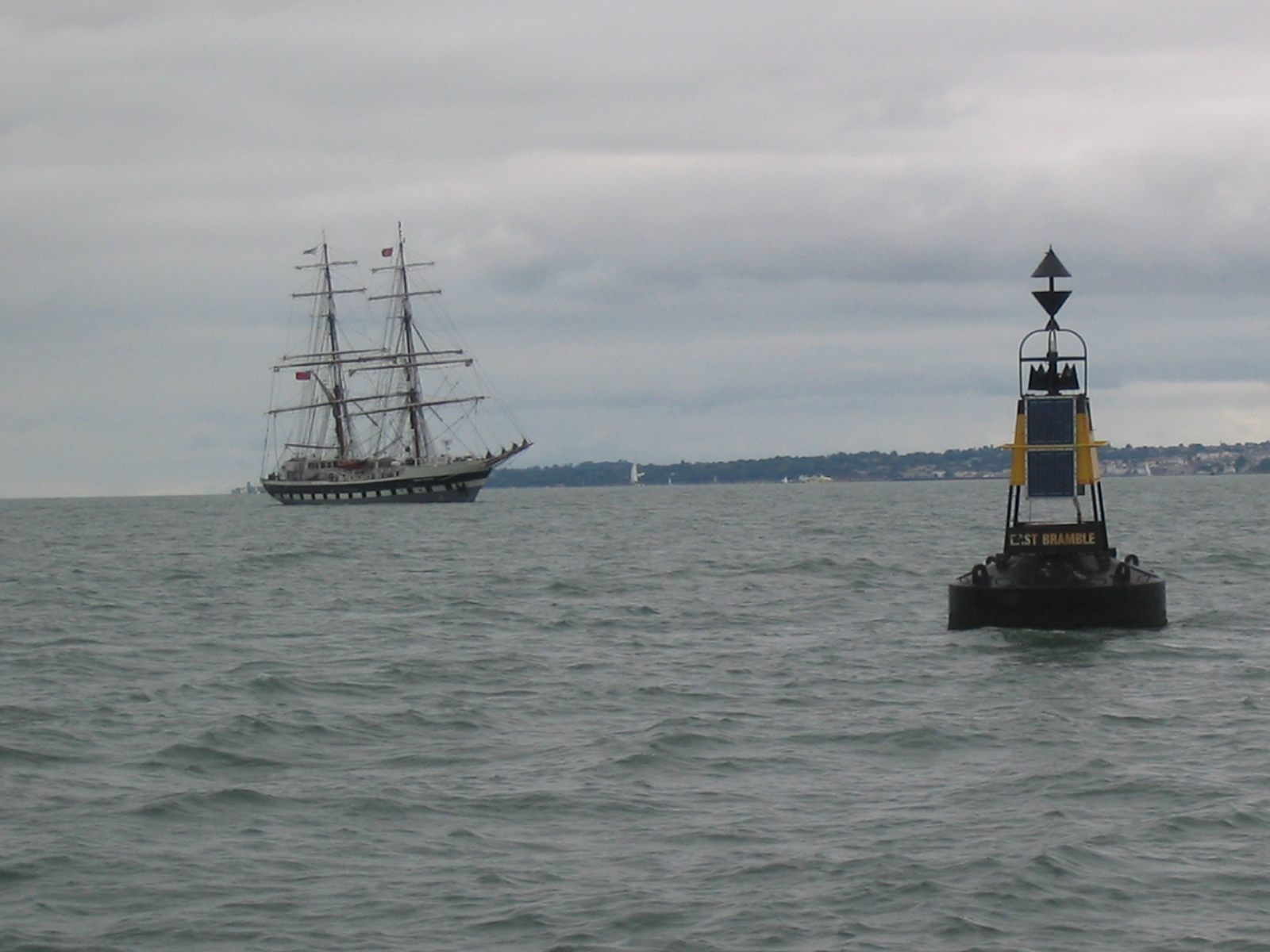
The Stavros S Niarchos in the Solent, August 2008

Stavros S Niarchos is a British brig-rigged tall ship, now renamed "Sunset". She was previously owned and operated by the Tall Ships Youth Trust (TSYT). She was primarily designed to provide young people with the opportunity to undertake voyages as character-building exercises, rather than pure sail-training. She was also used for adult voyages and holidays, which helped subsidise the operation of the ship.

== Construction ==
In the late 1990s the two schooners (Malcolm Miller and Sir Winston Churchill) then owned by the Tall Ships Youth Trust (then called the Sail Training Association (STA)) were showing their age and becoming increasingly expensive to maintain. The hulls for the two new brigs (Stavros S Niarchos and her sister ship, Prince William) were obtained half-completed from another project in Germany. These were transported to Appledore Shipbuilders in Devon, where they were modified to the TSYT's requirements, and fitted out. She was completed in January 2000. The rig was designed by Michael Willoughby, who wrote a few comments on the overall design of the brigs. The Stavros S Niarchos was named after Greek philanthropist Stavros Niarchos whose Foundation Trust funded the vessel.

== Notable voyages ==
Following completion of sea trials she was handed over to the STA at Avonmouth Docks. She sailed for her maiden voyage, a training voyage for permanent and volunteer crew, on 13 February 2000. She arrived in Weymouth, UK three days later.

During that trip she encountered a south westerly gale as she came round Land's End. She achieved an indicated speed through the water of 14 knots (26 km/h; 16 mph) under lower tops'ls and fore topmast stays'l alone.

In January 2006 Stavros S Niarchos rescued the two women crew from a vessel taking part in the 2005 Atlantic Rowing race. The rescue was made in heavy weather, with the assistance of a USCG Lockheed C-130 Hercules aircraft. In late 2006 TSYT Captain Darren Naggs was awarded the Thomas Gray Silver Medal of the Marine Society, for exemplary seamanship during the rescue.

== Rig ==
Stavros S Niarchos is a brig, that is a two masted vessel with square sails on both masts. She carries five yards on each mast (moving up: Course, Lower Topsail, Upper Topsail, Topgallant and Royal), and a total of 18 sails. In good conditions she has managed speeds of just over 13 knots (24 km/h; 15 mph).

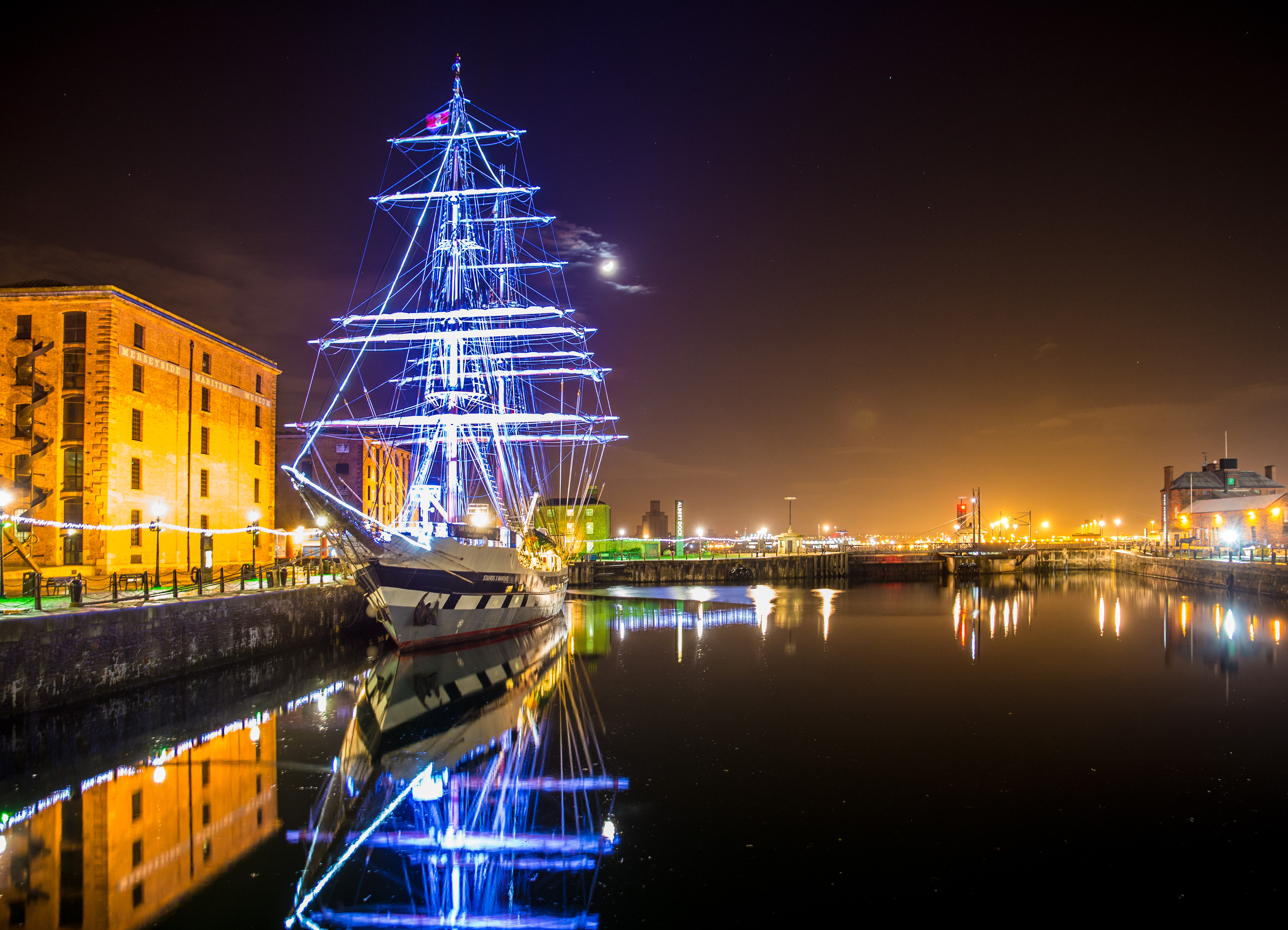
Illuminated "Stavros S Niarchos" in Albert Dock, Liverpool on Dec 27, 2014

== Crew ==
Stavros S Niarchos (and her sister ship, Prince William) normally sail with a crew of up to 67 people. The crew consists of 6 permanent salaried crew, 11 to 13 volunteer crew and up to 48 voyage crew. The voyage crewmembers, those paying to sail on the ship, are divided into three watches (Red, White and Blue) of 16. Each of these watches has a Watch Leader from the volunteer crew. The remaining crew are assigned as follows:

Permanent crew:

- Captain (Master)
- Chief Mate
- Second Mate
- Chief Engineer
- Boatswain (Bosun)
- Cook

Volunteer crew:

- Third Mate
- First Aid Purser
- 2nd Cook
- Assistant Cook
- Assistant Engineer
- 3 × Watch Leaders
- 2 × Deckhands (3 on adult voyages)
- 2 × Youth Mentors (youth voyages only)
- 2 × Supernumeraries (optional, adult voyages only)

On youth voyages the two Youth Mentors (YMs) are responsible for the various entertainment activities and competitions as well helping with any problems young people aboard may have. They are usually professionally qualified teachers or youth workers.

The 2 or 3 deckhands act as assistants to the bosun and as such are mostly concerned with the cleaning and maintenance of the ship.

== Future ==
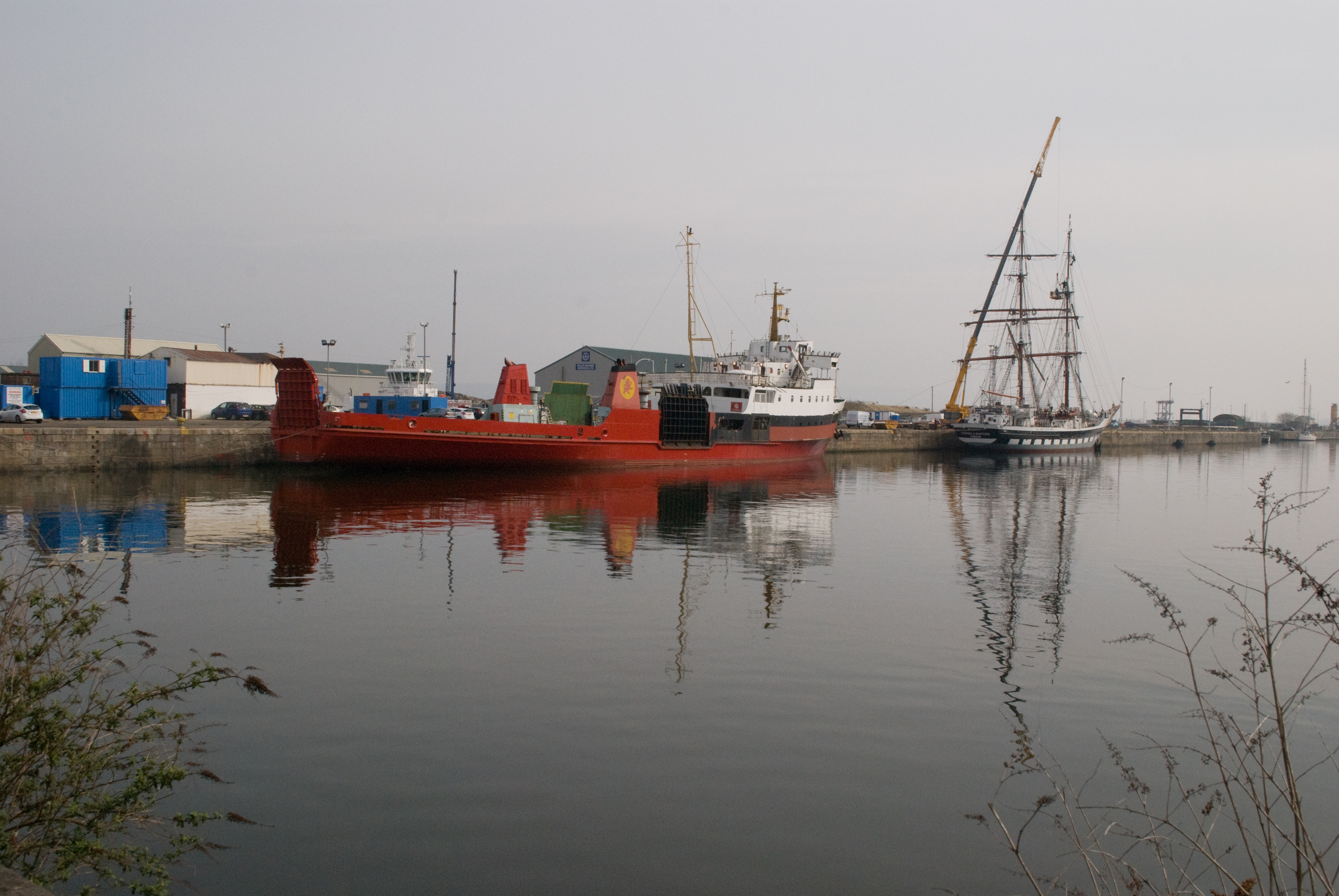
MV Saturn and Stavros S Niarchos in the James Watt Dock, Greenock in March 2015, after maintenance work in the adjacent Garvel dry dock.

In November 2011, the Tall Ships Youth Trust announced plans to sell Stavros S Niarchos, its last remaining tall ship, to focus on smaller vessels. Much of this is due to the high cost of running a vessel of such size due to pilotage charges and mooring fees for a vessel over 400 tonnes. This has become a contentious issue with the trust and its supporters where some see this as the abandonment of the tall ships for yachts within the trust. For others this is a return to the days of Sir Winston Churchill and Malcolm Miller which as smaller vessels didn't incur these charges and perhaps had better sailing and penetration and operation within UK sailing ports and waters. Although the schooners were smaller, some say they ran a much better programme and fulfilled the mandate of the former Sail Training Association, before it became TSYT.

The ship will continue in operation until a buyer is found, which the Trust expects to take several years based on their experience of selling Prince William.

The ship was sold on 30 September 2017 via C.W. Kellock & Co. Ltd., a London-based ship broker. It is no longer part of the Tall Ships Youth Trust fleet. On 16 October 2017, the ship's AIS broadcast name changed to "Sunset".
