= Type 2630 training ship =

Ship class

History

PRC
- Name: Brave the Wave
- Builder: Guangzhou Shipyard
- Laid down: 2016
- Christened: 2017
- Completed: 2017
- Commissioned: 2017
- In service: 2017
- Identification: Call sign: BRSY; IMO number: 9798181; MMSI number: 413495780

General characteristics
- Class & type: Brave the Wave
- Type: Type 2630
- Displacement: 1,200 long tons (1,200 t)
- Length: 85 m (278 ft 10 in)
- Beam: 11 m (36 ft 1 in)
- Propulsion: sail & diesel
- Speed: 18 kt
- Complement: 25 + 50 cadets
- Electronic warfare & decoys: None
- Armament: Unarmed
- Armour: None
- Aircraft carried: None
- Aviation facilities: None

Brave the Wave (Po Lang, 破浪) sail training ship is a Type 2630 tall ship, a Chinese auxiliary ship currently in service with the People's Liberation Army Navy (PLAN). Type 2630 full-rigged ship is named after the total area of its sails, which is 2630 square meters, and this full-rigged ship is designed by Damen Group, then modified by the builder Guangzhou Shipyard International to meet PLAN requirement, such as converting the kitchen and larder/pantry for cooking Chinese food. It has a sister ship Royal Navy of Oman Shabab Oman II. The ship is 85 meter long, beam of 11 meter, displaces over 1200 tons, capable of 18 kts. Launched in 2017 and entered Chinese service in the same year, Type 2630 only requires 25 crew to operate, and can accommodate an additional 50 naval cadets onboard.

| Type | Class | Pennant # | Commissioned | Status | Fleet |
|---|---|---|---|---|---|
| Type 2630 | Brave the Wave | 86 | 2017 | Active | Dalian Naval Academy |

== Service history ==
On 8 October 2024, Po Lang arrived at the Port of Colombo, Sri Lanka, for a formal visit. The vessel is commanded by Commander Ma Wenyong. After completing its official engagements, the vessel is scheduled to depart the island on 11 October 2024.
