= Queen of the Ocean =

Queen of the Ocean or Ocean Queen or variant, may refer to:

- cruise ship nickname
- ocean liner nickname
- Queen of the Ocean (album) 1998 album by Lana Lane
- Samudra Devi (Sinhala: සමුද්‍ර දේවී; literally Queen of the Oceans) a regular daily train service in Sri Lanka
- SS Ocean Queen (1857) a U.S. sidepaddle wooden steamboat
- MS Siritara Ocean Queen (1964) "Ocean Queen", a Siritara Enterprise cruise ship that sunk in 2006

== See also ==
- Queen of the Sea (disambiguation)
