= Tall Ships Youth Trust =

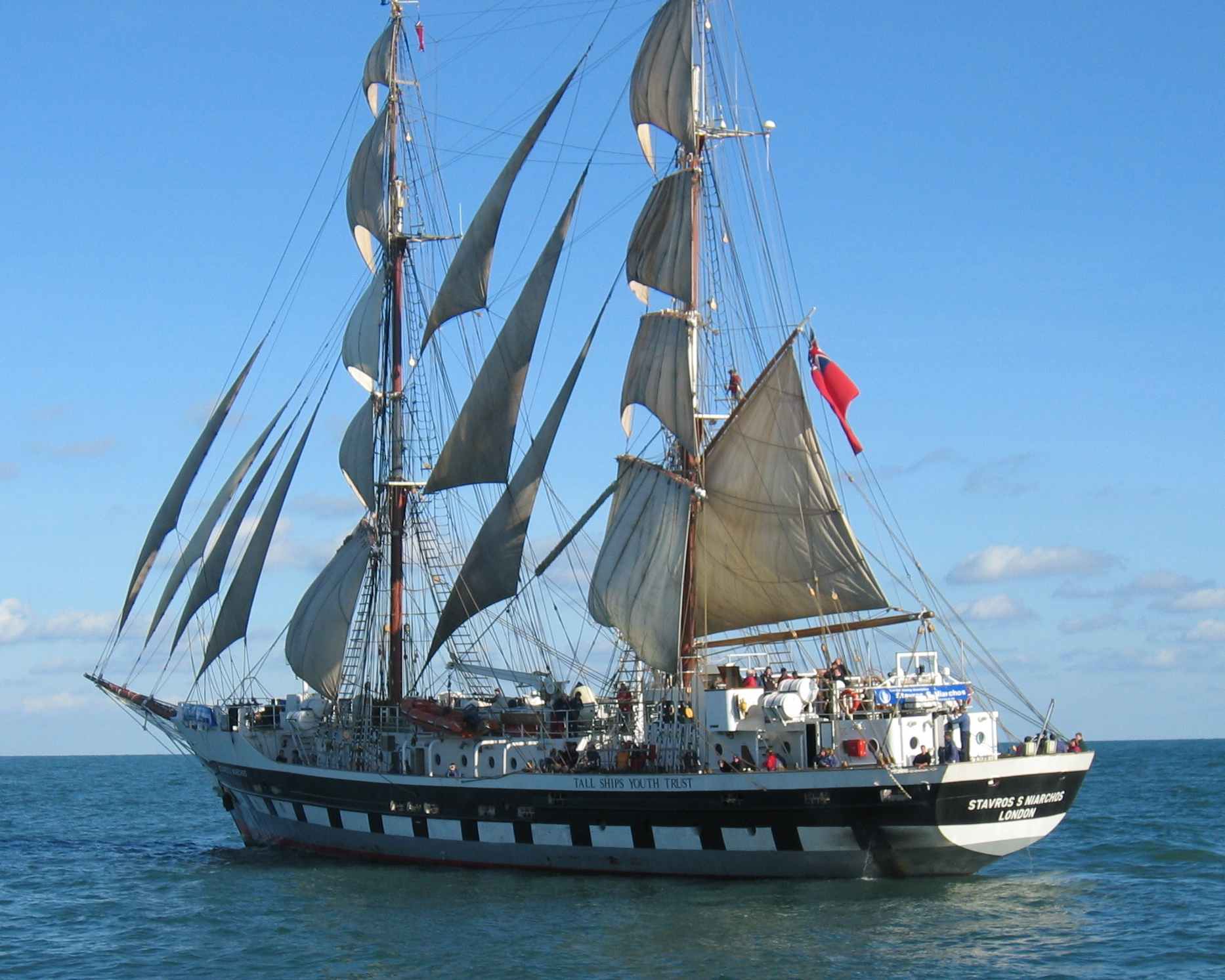
The Stavros S Niarchos under full sail off the Isle of Wight in October 2003

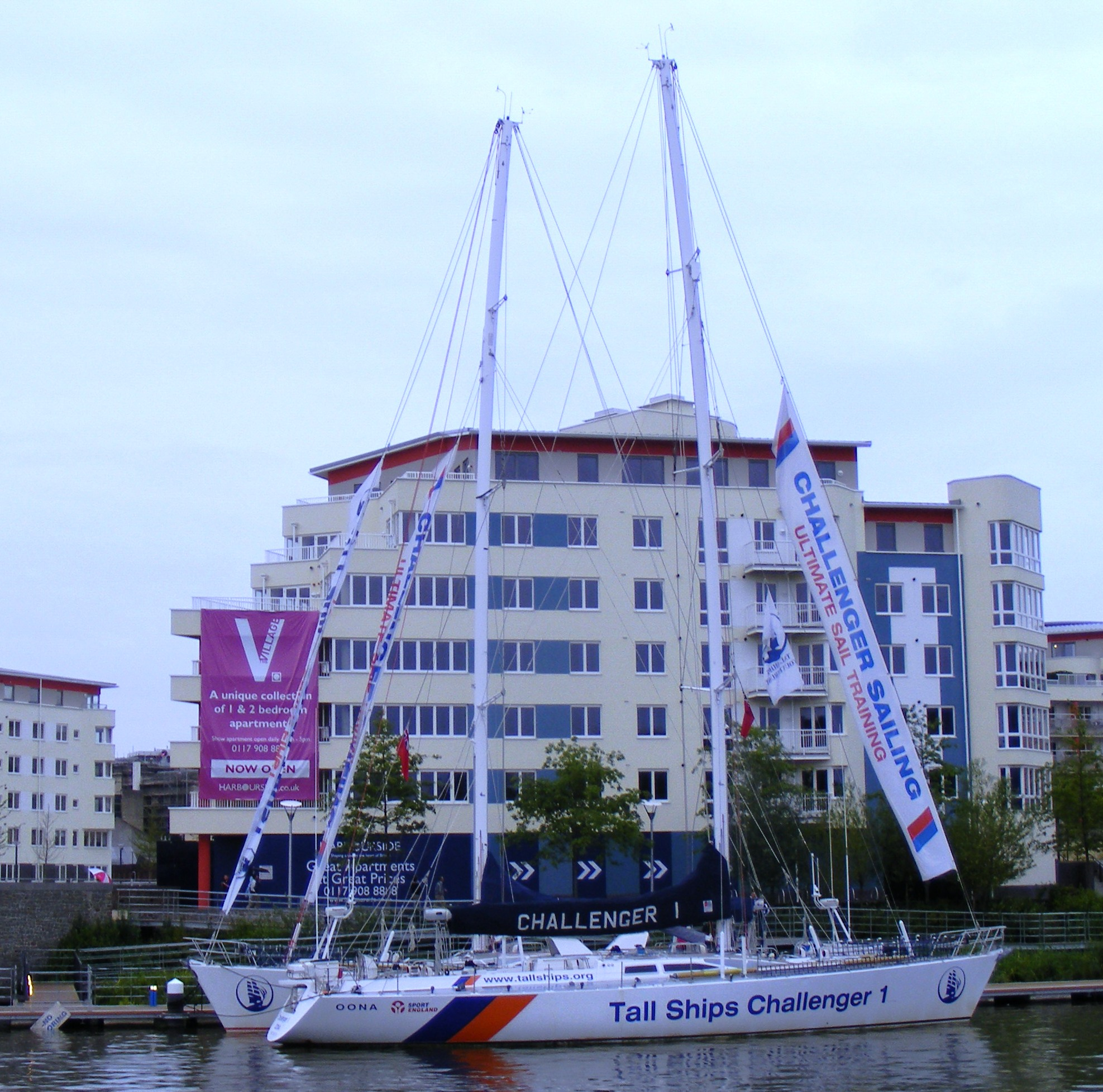
Tall Ships Challenger 1 - Oona

Tall Ships Youth Trust (TSYT) is a sail training organisation in the United Kingdom that currently owns and operates five 72ft Challenger yachts.

Tall Ships Youth Trust, formerly known as the Sail Training Association, based in Portsmouth, is a charity registered with the Charity Commission. It was founded in 1956 and is dedicated to the personal development of young people, particularly those experiencing disadvantage, aged 12 to 25 through the crewing of ocean-going yachts. Thanks to this work with young people, Tall Ships Youth Trust is a member of The National Council for Voluntary Youth Services (NCVYS).

Each year, TSYT supports around 1,200 young people from across the UK through exhilarating voyages.

Tall Ships Youth Trust has operated a variety of craft; it used to own TS K1 Sir Winston Churchill and TS K2 Malcolm Miller. These two three-masted topsail schooners are now privately owned and in the Mediterranean. TSYT used to operate a second sister-ship in addition to Stavros S Niarchos, the Prince William. However Prince William was removed from operational status at the end of 2007, to make way for the new Challenger yachts. In 2010 she was sold to the Pakistan Navy and renamed Rah Naward ("Swift Mover").

The Challenger yachts provide a flexible approach to sail training, allowing TSYT to scale the amount of sailings relative to demand (i.e. not all yachts need to sail).

The Challenger yachts were part of a fleet of twelve vessels built and raced in the 2000-01 and 2004-05 BT Global Challenge. The acquisition of these craft gave TSYT four thoroughly -tested vessels on which to base its sail training programme.

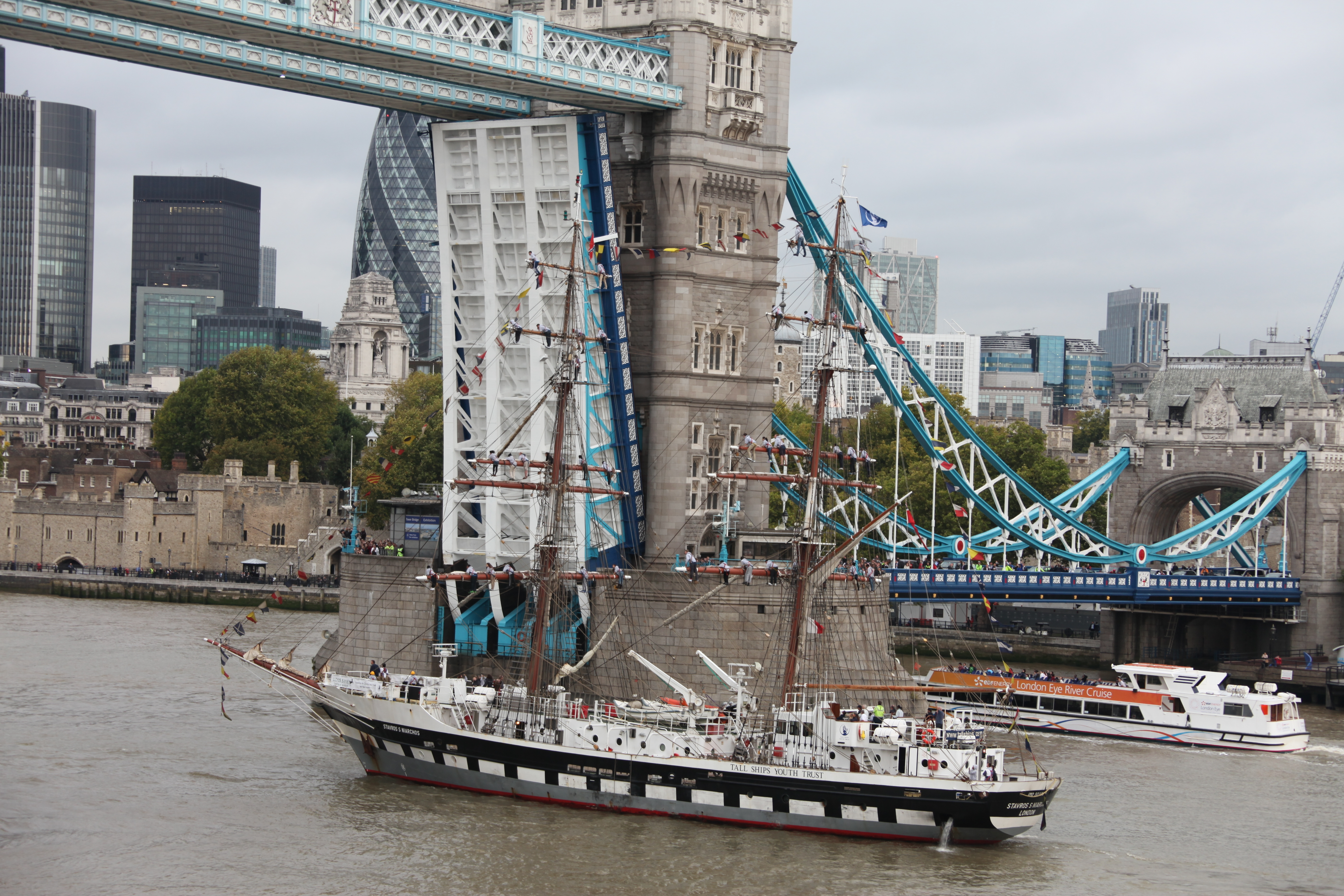
The Stavros S Niarchos in London in 2011

== See also ==
- Jubilee Sailing Trust
  - Lord Nelson
  - SV Tenacious
- Sea Cadet Corps
  - Royalist
  - Prince William
