= Pacific Swift (ship) =

Canadian tall ship

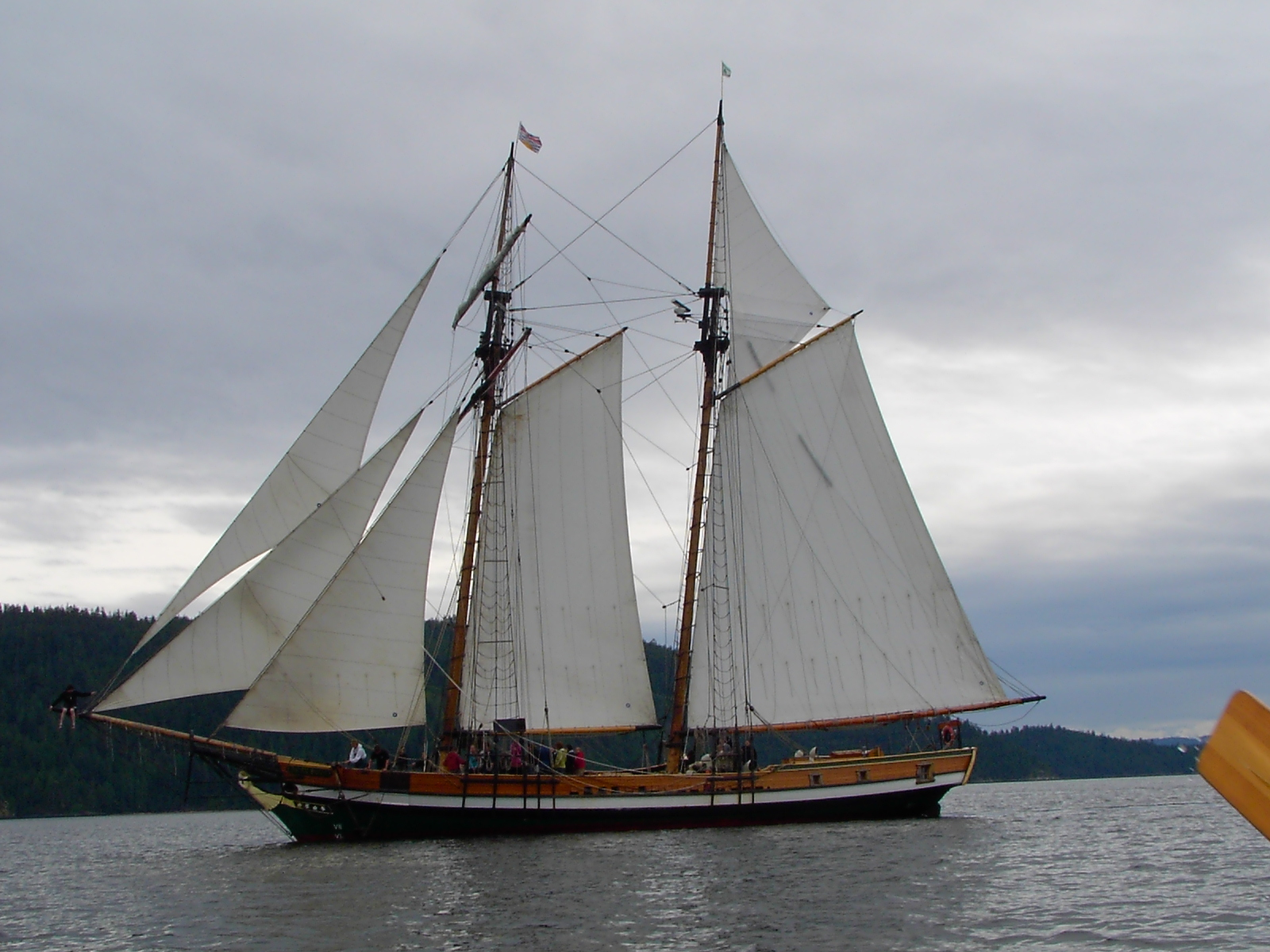
- Pacific Swift under sail

History

Canada
- Name: Pacific Swift
- Operator: S.A.L.T.S. Sail and Life Training Society
- Builder: S.A.L.T.S. Sail and Life Training Society
- Laid down: Expo 86, Vancouver BC
- Launched: 1986
- In service: March – October
- Out of service: November – February
- Homeport: Victoria, British Columbia, Canada
- Identification: MMSI number: 316001487; Callsign: CFC2233

General characteristics
- Displacement: 98 Tonnes
- Length: 111 ft (34 m) (sparred)
- Beam: 20 ft 6 in (6.25 m)
- Draught: 10 ft 6 in (3.20 m)
- Propulsion: 6-cylinder Isuzu diesel, 160 hp approx.
- Sail plan: Square topsail schooner
- Speed: 13.5 kn (25.0 km/h) under sail; 6 kn (11 km/h) under engine
- Boats & landing craft carried: 3 dories, 1 Zodiac
- Complement: 6 crew, 30 trainees

The Pacific Swift is a square topsail schooner, built by S.A.L.T.S. as a working exhibit at Expo '86 in Vancouver, British Columbia. She provides 5- to 10-day sail training programs for young people and day sails for S.A.L.T.S. members around Vancouver Island and along the coast of British Columbia.

The Pacific Swift has completed four offshore voyages, some of more than a year in duration. Her offshore travels have taken her to Australia and Europe, to remote communities on Easter and Pitcairn Island, and to many other far-flung ports of call. She has logged over 100,000 nautical miles (190,000 km).

The Pacific Swift has a sparred length of 34 m, total sail area of 510 sq m and weighs 71.45 gross tons. The Swift is a traditional tall ship which requires manpower to sail.

== See also ==
- List of schooners
