= Sir Winston Churchill (schooner) =

Sail training ship built in 1966

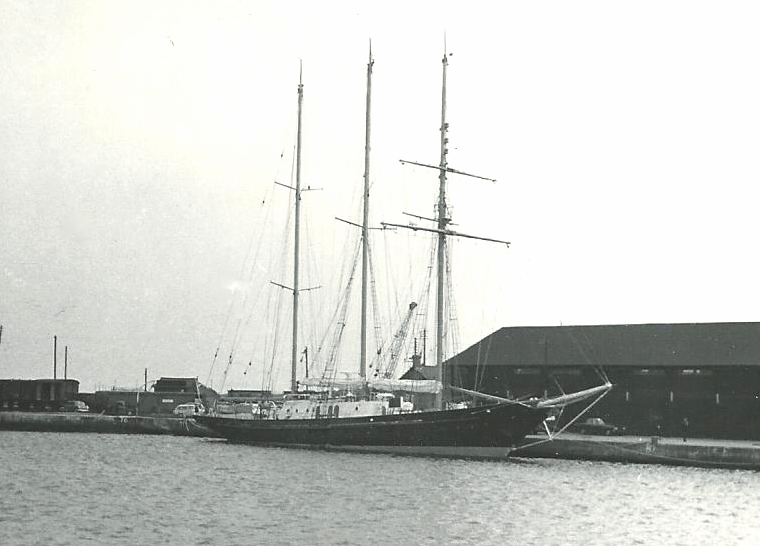

History
- Name: Sir Winston Churchill
- Namesake: Winston Churchill
- Owner: 1966–2000: Tall Ships Youth Trust; from 2000: privately owned
- Port of registry: UK; Greece
- Builder: Richard Dunston Ltd, Hessle
- Laid down: 24 November 1964
- Launched: 5 February 1966
- In service: 3 March 1966
- Identification: IMO number: 1003968; Official Number: 308356; Callsign: GRZZ
- Status: Private yacht

General characteristics
- Class & type: Private yacht
- Tonnage: 218 GRT
- Displacement: 333 tonnes (328 long tons)
- Length: 134 ft 9 in (41.07 m) overall
- Beam: 24 ft 9 in (7.54 m)
- Draught: 16 ft 1 in (4.90 m)
- Propulsion: 8,738 square feet (811.8 m^{2}) sail, 2 × Iveco 360 horsepower (270 kW) diesel engines
- Sail plan: Schooner
- Speed: 12 knots (22 km/h)
- Crew: 9 crew, 13 passengers

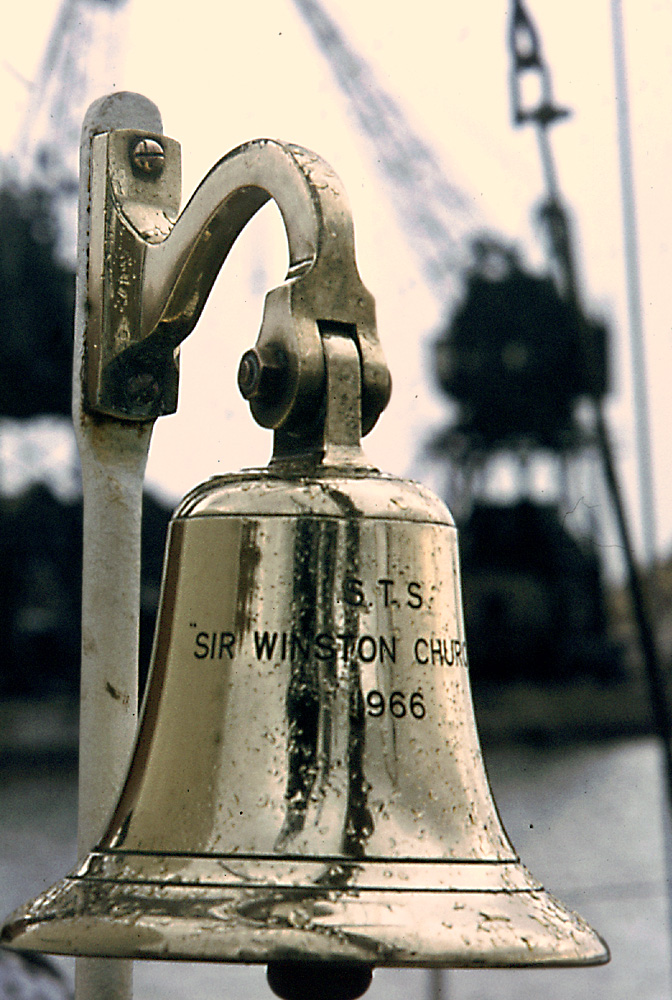
Ship's bell

Sir Winston Churchill was a sail training ship which was built in Hessle, Yorkshire by Richard Dunston Ltd. She was sold out of service in 2000 and currently serves as a private yacht.

== History ==
Sir Winston Churchill was designed by Camper & Nicholson and built in 1966 to take boys on sail training trips. The patron of the project was Prince Philip, Duke of Edinburgh. Public donations partly funded construction of the ship, and the Sail Training Association raised about half the needed money. The vessel was named after Winston Churchill, wartime leader and twice Prime Minister of the United Kingdom; Churchill had died the year before his namesake's construction. Her rig was deliberately designed to incorporate all the main types of sail. In November 1965, Sir Winston Churchill toppled over onto her starboard side whilst she was being fitted out. All three masts were broken. The accident happened a week before she was due to be launched by Princess Alexandra.

On January 1, 1967, an open porthole near the waterline allowed the rising tide to flood the ship at her berth in Southampton, Hampshire. She was pumped out and refloated the same day. On 26 July 1967, she ran aground at Holyhead Harbour, Anglesey but was refloated after four hours.

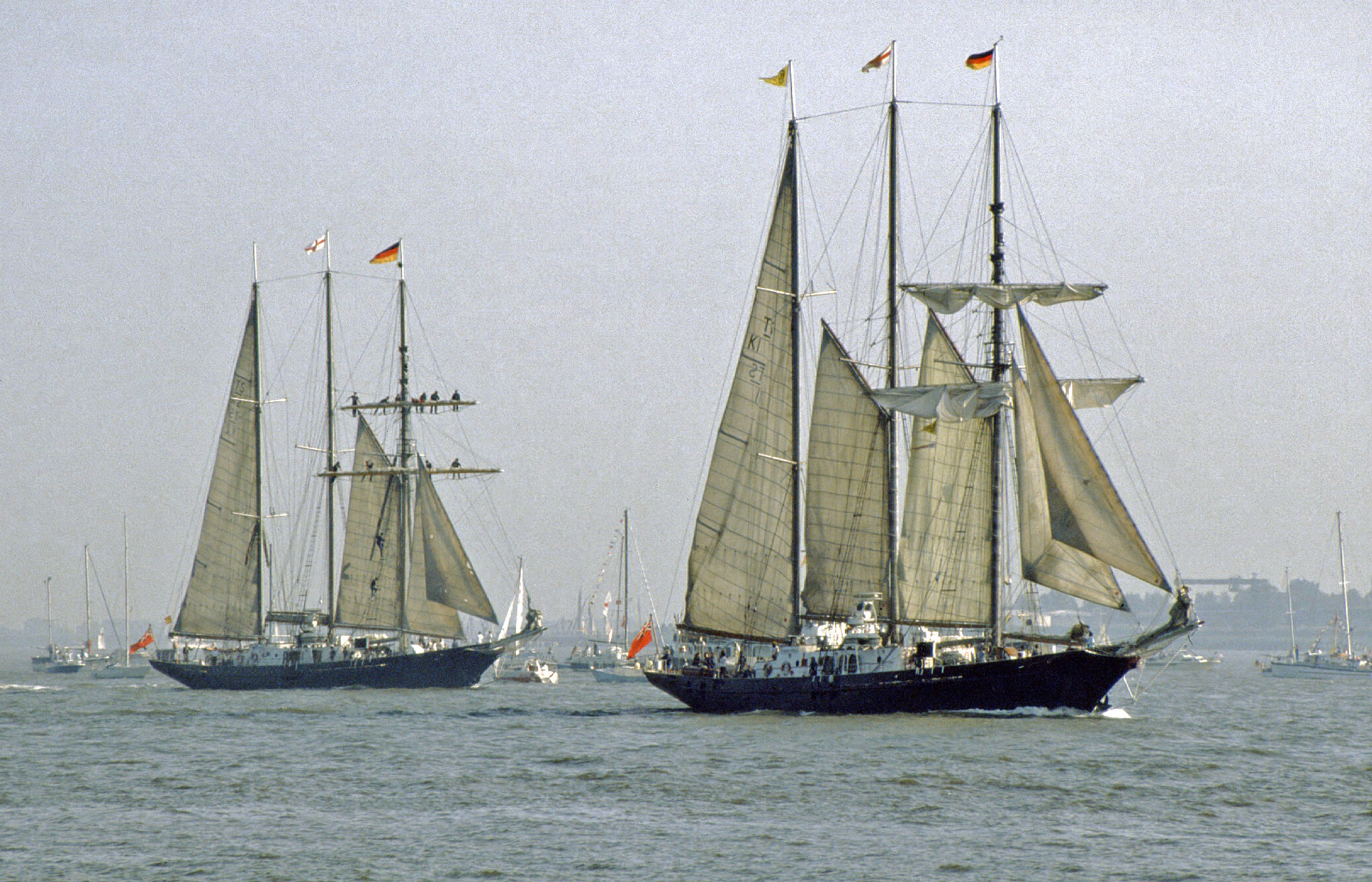
Sir Winston Churchill and Malcolm Miller 1986 in Bremerhaven

In 1968 a sister ship, Malcolm Miller was launched. Sir Winston Churchill differed from Malcolm Miller in having round topped cabin doors as opposed to square topped doors. A further difference was that the Sir Winston Churchill was trimmed slightly lower at the stern - because the concrete ballast had run aft slightly when it was poured during her construction. This difference in trim can be seen in most photographs of the two ships together.

Sir Winston Churchill entered the 1979 Tall Ships Race with an all-female crew. In 1976, the vessel took part in a transatlantic race to celebrate the Bicentenary of the United States Declaration of Independence. On 27 July 1981, she ran aground 4 nautical miles (7.4 km) off Great Yarmouth, Norfolk with 39 female trainees on board. In 2000, Sir Winston Churchill was replaced in service by Prince William and sold by her owners, the Tall Ships Youth Trust. Her last voyage for the Tall Ships Youth Trust ended on 2 December 2000 at Portsmouth.

Sir Winston Churchill was sold to a company based in the Isle of Man. Initially she was used as a sail training ship, with a reduced capacity of 20 trainees instead of the 39 (3 watches of 13, Fore, Main & Mizzen) that the Tall Ships Youth Trust carried. She was totally refitted and re-engined in 2002 with twin Iveco diesel engines replacing her 270 horsepower (200 kW) Ford Mermaid engines. She was originally fitted with 2 off 654 Perkins engines for propulsion and 2 off 499 for power generation.

== See also ==
- List of schooners
- List of large sailing yachts
