= Queen of the Sea (ship) =

Tall ship

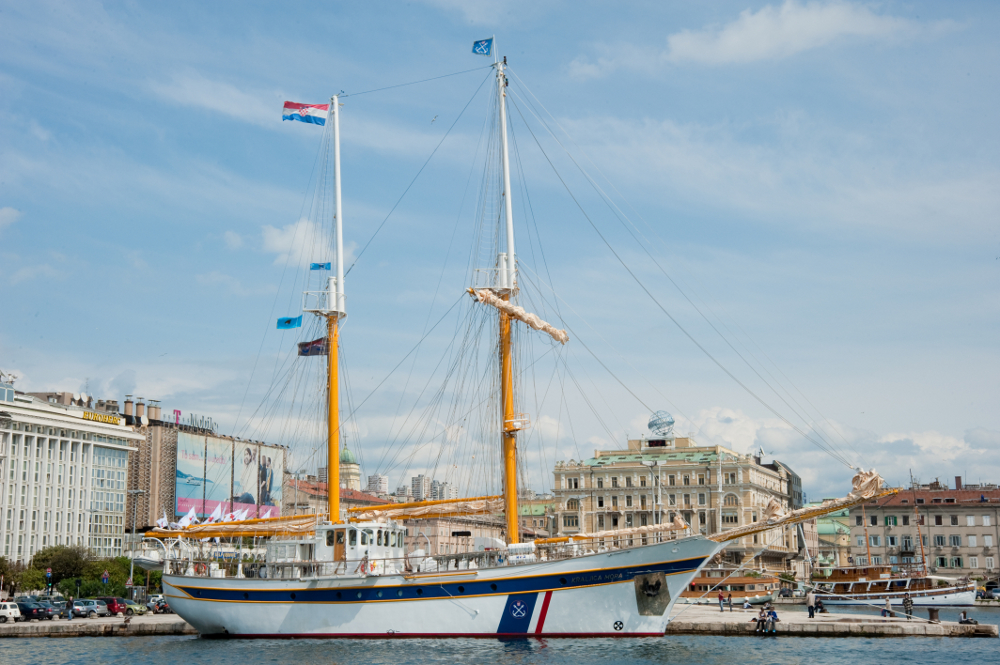
- Queen of the Sea in Rijeka

History

Croatia
- Owner: Croatian Government
- Operator: Jadrolinija
- Ordered: Ministry of Maritime Affairs, Transport and Infrastructure
- Builder: Montmontaža - Greben, Vela Luka
- Cost: 37 million HRK
- Launched: 13 November 2009
- Sponsored by: Jadranka Kosor
- Home port: Rijeka
- Identification: IMO number: 9569358; MMSI number: 238261000; Callsign: 9AA6962
- Status: Active

General characteristics
- Class & type: Training ship
- Length: 35 m (115 ft)
- Beam: 855 m (2,805 ft)
- Draught: 265 m (869 ft)
- Propulsion: Sail, marine engine
- Speed: 6/11 knot (1.0 km/h; 0.63 mph)
- Crew: 7

Queen of the Sea (Croatian: Kraljica mora) is a tall ship designed and used to train vocational school and university students in Croatia. Constructed in 2009, she is the first training ship built after Croatia declared independence from SFR Yugoslavia.

== History ==
The financing and use of the vessel for training of students was adopted by the Croatian Government in mid-2007. The ship was designed by the engineers at the Croatian Shipbuilding Institute in Zagreb. Work dipping was conducted on November 13, 2009 in the shipyard Montmontaža - Greben in Vela Luka. Ministry of Maritime Affairs, Transport and Infrastructure entrusted the ship management services to the private company Adriatic Sea Service from Rijeka. In March 2013, management was taken over by the state-owned ferry operator, Jadrolinija.

== Description ==
Queen of the Sea is a training vessel of the 'logger' type, a motor sailing ship with two masts, 35 meters long, 8.55 meters wide with a 2.65 meter draft. She was designed to accommodate 28 students, four teachers and seven crew members. The vessel has gross tonnage of 298 and can reach a speed of six knots by sail and eleven knots by motor.

In 2016 the vessel was valued at 37 million kunas ($5.5 million).

== Gallery ==
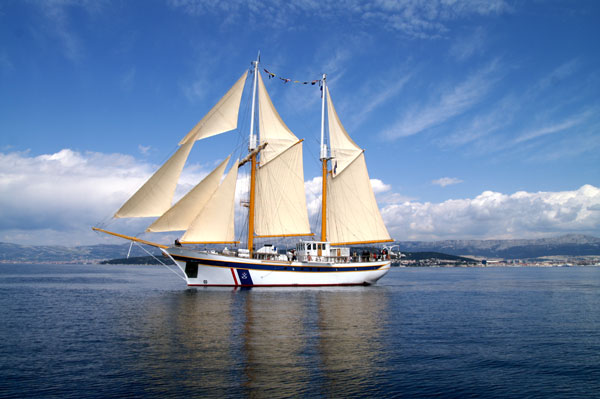
Queen of the Sea sailing

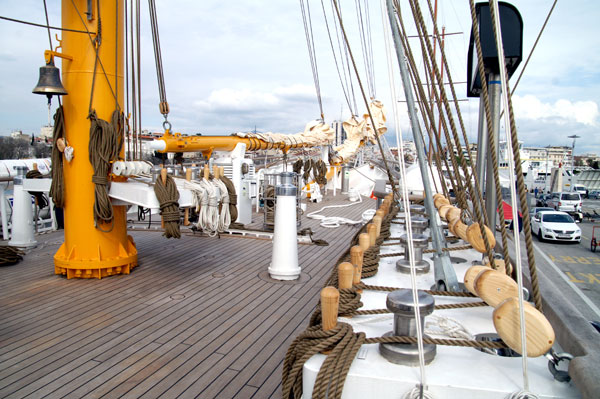
Deck

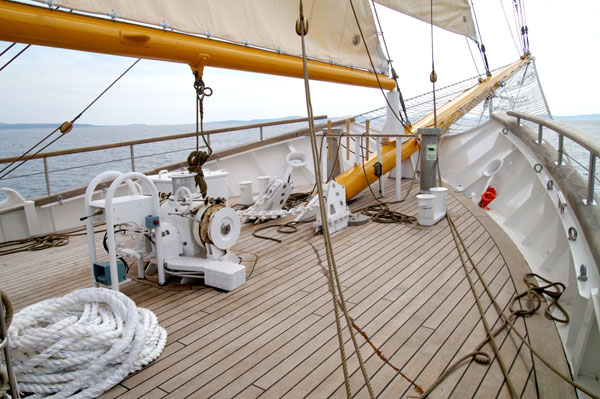
Forecastle Deck

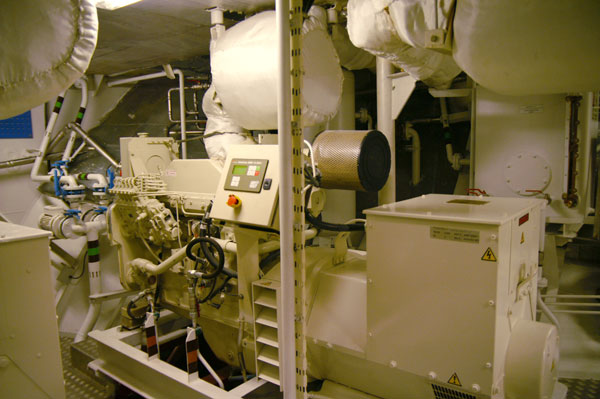
Engine

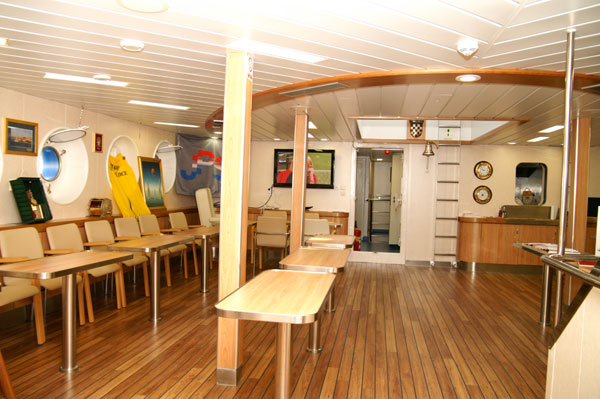
Central Hall
