= Malcolm Miller (schooner) =

1968 schooner

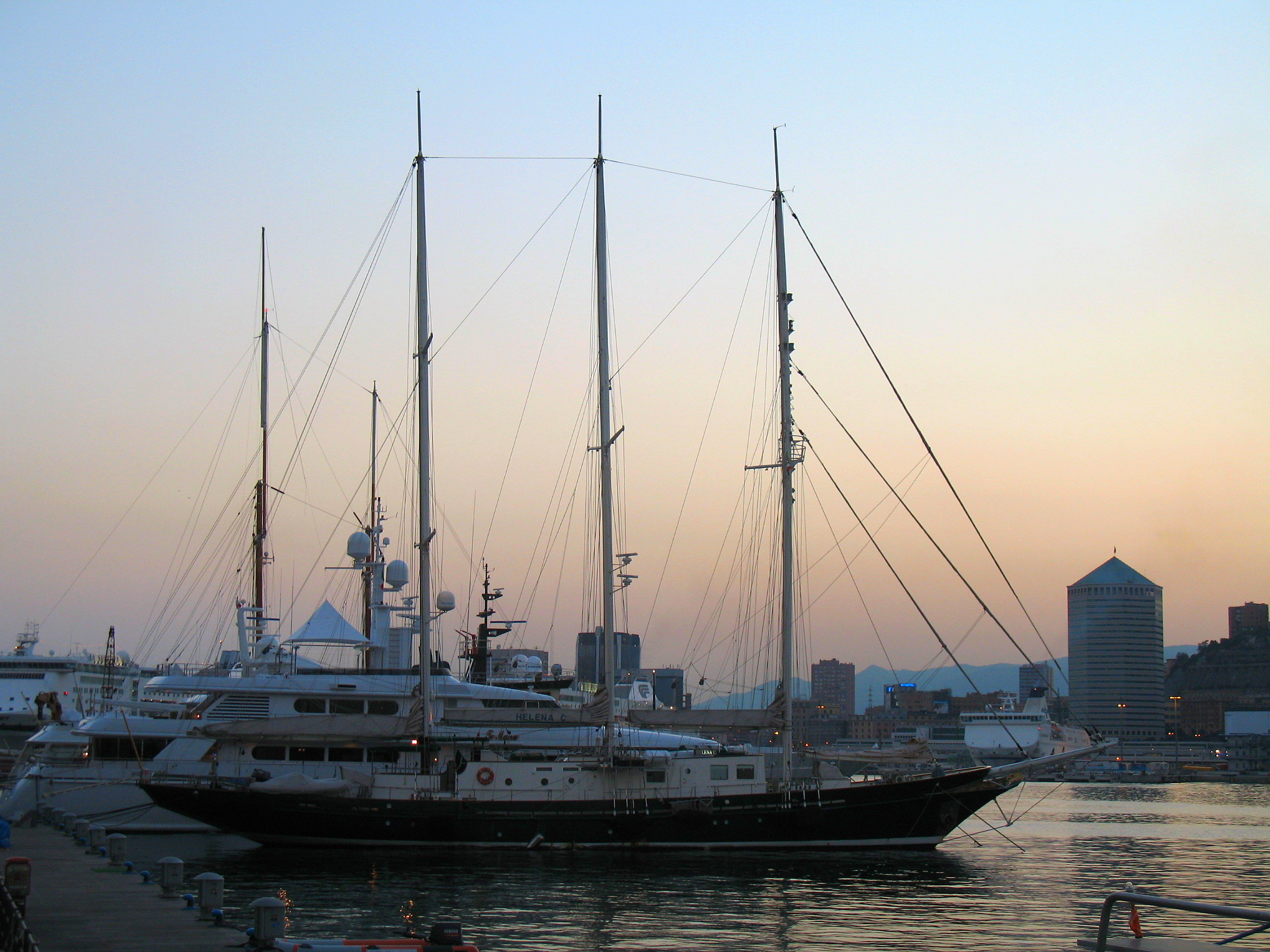
- The Helena C in Genova in August 2007.

History

Cyprus
- Name: Malcolm Miller
- Builder: John Lewis & Sons, Aberdeen
- Yard number: 353
- Laid down: 23 March 1967
- Launched: 10 October 1967
- In service: 10 March 1968
- Identification: MMSI number: 235111139; Callsign: 2INC6
- Status: active

General characteristics
- Class & type: Private yacht
- Displacement: 299 metric tonnes full load
- Length: 45.68 m (149.87 ft) sparred; 41.15 m (135.01 ft) overall
- Beam: 8.31 m (27.26 ft)
- Draught: 5.73 m (18.80 ft)
- Sail plan: 3-mast bermuda schooner

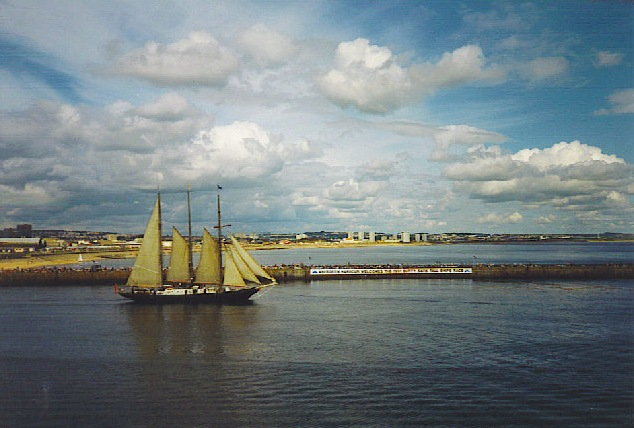
Malcolm Miller 1991, leaving Aberdeen

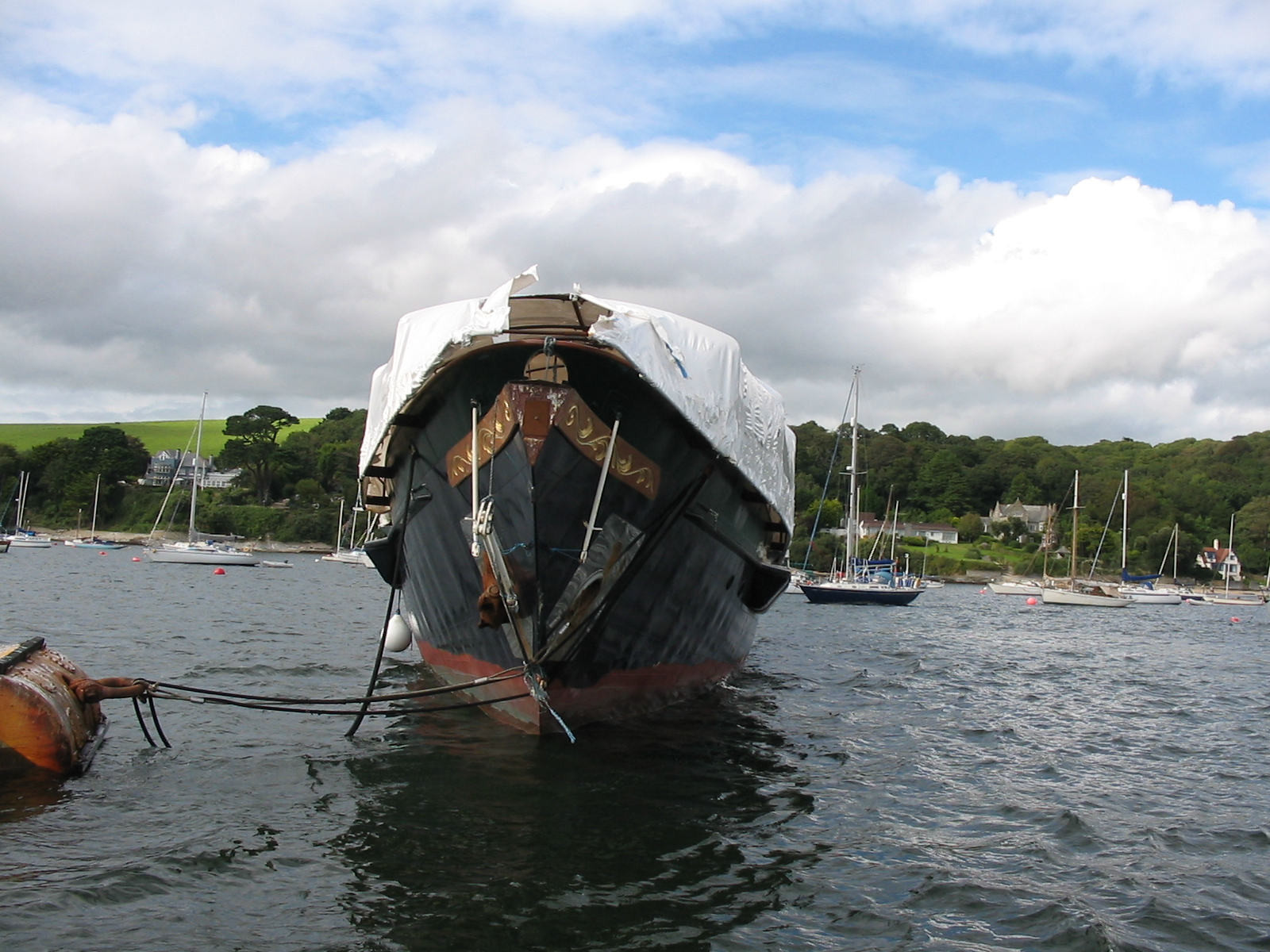
The Malcolm Miller on a buoy in Falmouth harbour, August 2009.

The Malcolm Miller is a sistership of the three-mast schooner Sir Winston Churchill designed by Camper & Nicholsons. She was built by John Lewis & Sons in Aberdeen and first served as a Sail training ship before being converted into a yacht.

== History ==
The Malcolm Miller was built in 1967. Half of the construction cost was donated by Sir James Miller, a former Lord Mayor of London and Lord Provost of Edinburgh. She was named in memory of Sir James's son Malcolm, who had been killed in a car accident. She was used by the Sail Training Association as a sail training ship.

In 2000, the Malcolm Miller was replaced in service by the Stavros S Niarchos. In 2001, the Malcolm Miller was sold and her new owners renamed her Helena C. She was rebuilt and redelivered in 2004 as a private pleasure ship. She crossed the Atlantic Ocean on two occasions.

In June 2008 she was damaged by fire while being refurbished, leaving one man with serious burns. In August 2009, the ship was moored to a buoy in Falmouth harbour, mastless and bearing the name Malcolm Miller. In November 2011, she was laid up off Tolverne on the River Fal. Subsequently, she was sold to the owner of a commercial yard in Cyprus. In January 2012, she was towed to Saint Peter Port and then to Gdańsk, to undergo a complete refit at the Conrad shipyard. She was relaunched in 2014, and in July 2016 made a brief visit to the UK.

She is currently (2025) operating as a charter vessel under her original name Malcolm Miller and is registered in Limassol, Cyprus.

== See also ==
- List of schooners
