= PNS Rah Naward =

Sail training ship of the Pakistan Navy

Prince William alongside in Fredrikstad at the end of the Tall Ships' Race 2005.

Naval Jack of Pakistan

PNS Rah Naward is a sail training ship of the Pakistan Navy. She was commissioned in 2001 as Prince William for the Tall Ships Youth Trust and sold in 2010 to the Pakistan Navy and renamed Rah Naward ("Swift Mover").

Rah Naward has the callsign ARNR and the IMO number 9222326.

== History as "Prince William" ==
Rah Naward was built as Prince William, one of two tall ships commissioned by the Tall Ships Youth Trust (formerly the Sail Training Association), obtained half-completed from another project in Germany. They were transported to Appledore Shipbuilders in Devon, where they were modified to the TSYT's requirements, and fitted out.

The TSYT's ships are two-masted brigs, with the rig designed by Michael Willoughby. The hulls were built in Germany as cruise ships for the West Indies, designed to carry masts and sails and use them from time to time, but not to be serious sailing vessels. This project was cancelled and the part-finished hulls were bought in 1997 by the TSYT. They were then modified by Appledore Shipbuilders to take the strains of a full sailing rig and to improve their sailing properties, including the addition of a new deeper keel holding fifty tons of ballast.

Prince William's rig was designed according to traditional rules and is occasionally modified slightly with trainees in mind. The foremast is slightly shorter than the main mast, but they are otherwise identical. Each consists of a steel lower mast and topmast and timber topgallant and royal mast. Spars are steel on the lower and topmasts (course, lower topsail and upper topsail yards) and timber above this (topgallant and royal yards). Access to the tops is by a vertical "jacob's ladder" down to the ratlines, rather than inverted futtock shrouds. There is a gold sovereign placed under the foremast where it meets the keel, a tradition supposed to give the ship luck.

The accommodation for voyage crew (i.e. ordinary paying crew members) is in six eight-berth cabins, two for each watch. Volunteers are in 2-3 berth cabins and the permanent crew have individual cabins. The accommodation is air-conditioned, because the ship spends a significant amount of time in tropical waters each year.

The first sighting of Excelsior as Prince William closed to offer assistance during the 2005 Tall Ships' Race to Norway.

Prince William competed in the 2005 Tall Ships' Races. She came fourth in class (of 25) and fourth overall (of 100+) in the first race from Waterford to Cherbourg. In the second race, from Newcastle to Fredrikstad, she suspended racing in order to answer a distress call from another vessel, the Lowestoft trawler Excelsior, which was in danger of losing her mast and sinking. The Prince William, which is registered as a UK Auxiliary Coastguard vessel, stood by Excelsior in case of disaster, supplied a portable pump via RIB in large seas, and accompanied her into Fredrikstad in case of further damage. Prince William was listed as "retired" by the race authorities, but was awarded a prize for her actions.

Prince William completed her final voyage with the TSYT in 2007; its 6th Brig Match Race in Portsmouth, 29 October – 1 November 2007, competing alongside sister ship; Stavros S Niarchos. With bright sunny skies and freshening winds, the two majestic brigs battled it out over a series of four races on courses set towards Cowes on the first day and Sandown Bay on the Isle of Wight on the second. In the end, Captain Liam Keating on Stavros S Niarchos took home the Tall Ships Challenge Cup having closely beaten Captain Roy Love on Prince William 2–1 (one race abandoned due to light winds).

== Sale in 2010 ==
In 2007 the trustees of the TSYT decided to sell Prince William and she was laid up in Portsmouth Dockyard and later at Hull.

Following interest from the Pakistan Navy, her sale was completed on 20 September 2010.

== See also ==
- List of large sailing vessels
