= TS Royalist (2014) =

2014 sail training ship

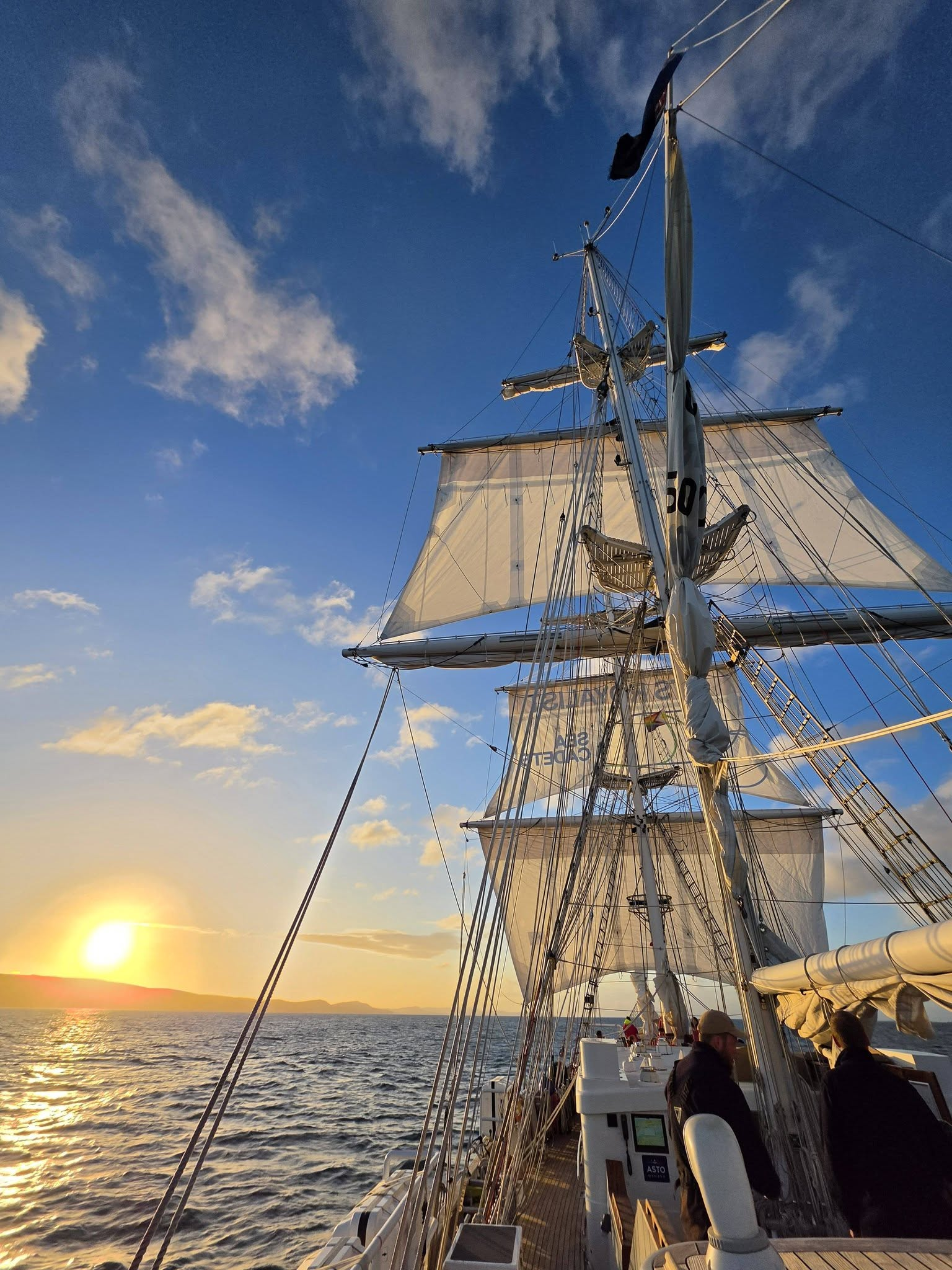
- TS Royalist under sail during a Sea Cadets training voyage

History

United Kingdom
- Name: Royalist
- Owner: The Marine Society and Sea Cadets
- Ordered: 2014
- Builder: Astilleros Gondán S.A.
- Cost: £4,800,000
- Launched: 19 December 2014
- Commissioned: 2015
- In service: 2015
- Identification: Call sign: 2HZW6; IMO number: 9717369; MMSI number: 235107983
- Status: Sailing

General characteristics
- Length: 31.98 metres (104 ft 11 in) overall
- Beam: 7.36 metres (24 ft 2 in)
- Draught: 3.18 metres (10 ft 5 in)
- Sail plan: Brig, 536 square metres (641 sq yd) sail area
- Capacity: 12 passengers
- Complement: 8 crew, plus up to 24 cadets
- Notes: Replacement for TS Royalist (1971)

TS Royalist is a sail training ship launched in 2014 as a replacement for a previous ship of the same name, TS Royalist (1971). She entered service with The Marine Society and Sea Cadets in 2015.

== Construction ==
Royalist is 34 metres (111 ft 7 in) long, with a beam of 7.36 metres (24 ft 2 in). Her draught is 3.25 metres (10 ft 8 in). The ship's hull is of high tensile steel, with her superstructure of glass reinforced plastic. She is rigged as a brig, with a sail area of 536 square metres (641 sq yd). Royalist has a permanent crew of eight, plus up to 24 Cadets and 2 adult trainees. Twelve passengers can also be carried.

== History ==
Royalist was built by Astilleros Gondán S.A., Spain. She was launched on 19 December 2014. She cost £4,800,000. Replacing the previous TS Royalist, she is designed to be easier to sail than her predecessor, and also faster. Royalist entered service in 2015.
