= Jollyboat (dinghy) =

Type of ship or boat

Traditionally the term jolly boat refers to a boat carried by a ship, powered by 4 or six oars and occasionally yawl rigged sails. The term might also refer to

- A Jollyboat is a 1953 sailing dinghy designed by Uffa Fox. It was the fastest dinghy in its day, and was built by Fairey Marine 1953 - 1971.
- A Jollyboat is a New Zealand sailing dinghy designed by John Spencer. It is intended to be suitable for low cost home construction for sailing by teenagers or a parent and child.
- Jolly Boat a 15-foot ketch rigged heavy open boat available in GRP and designed by famous yacht designer Laurent Giles and made by AJS Marine in Chichester. AJS marine brochure
