= Sail training =

Training on handling a sailing vessel

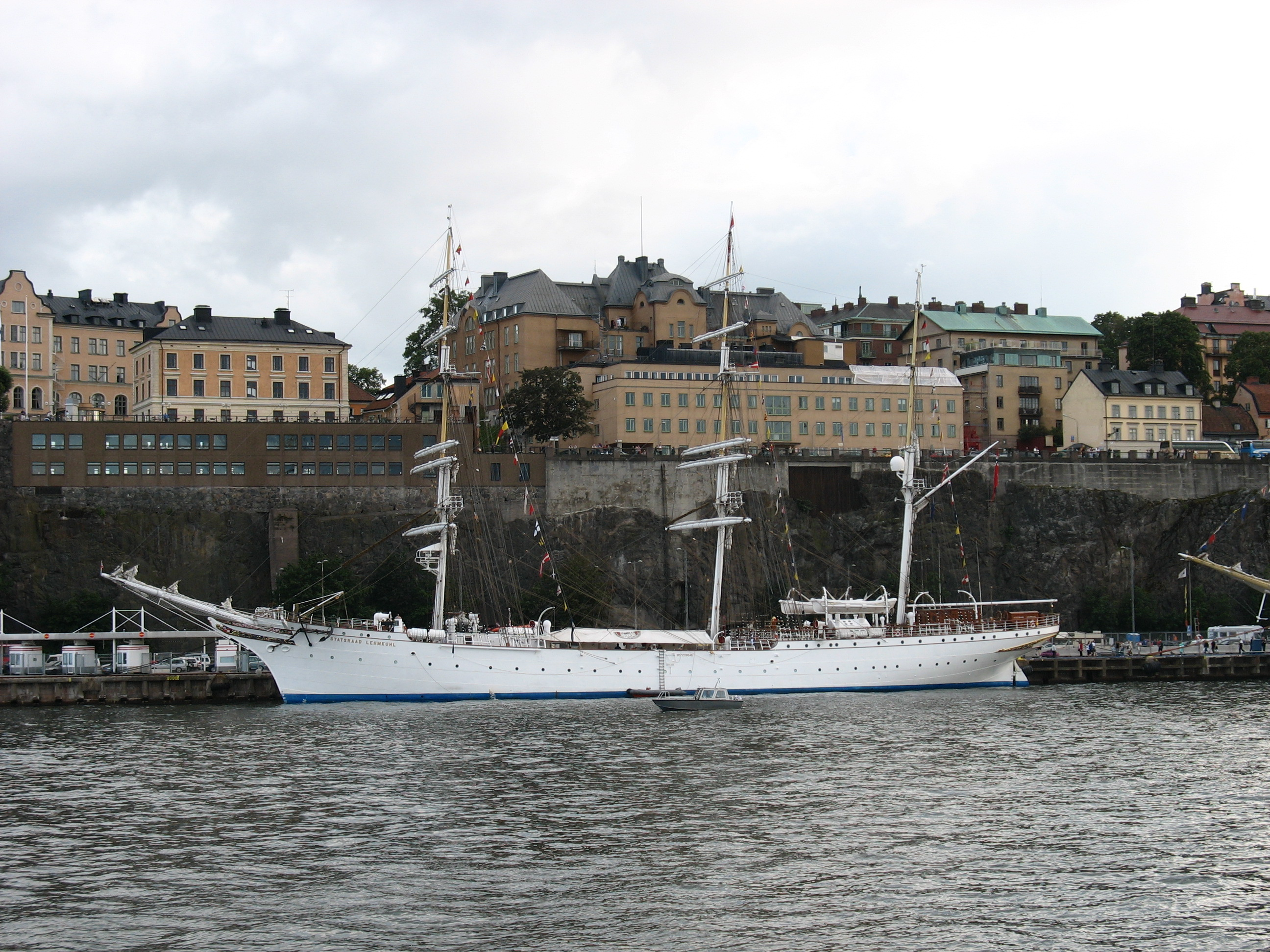
Built in 1914 as Großherzog Friedrich August, a school training ship for the German merchant marine, the since 1921 Norwegian-owned Statsraad Lehmkuhl, is one of the oldest sail training ships in service

From its modern interpretations to its antecedents when maritime nations would send young naval officer candidates to sea (e.g., see Outward Bound), sail training provides an unconventional and effective way of building many useful skills on and off the water.

== Background ==
By 1900, most commercial sailing vessels were struggling to turn a profit in the face of competition from more modern steam ships which had become efficient enough to steam shorter great circle routes between ports instead of the longer trade wind routes used by sailing ships.

Ships were built larger to carry bulk cargoes more efficiently, their rigs were simplified to reduce manning costs and speed was no longer a premium. Owners shipped cargoes that were non-perishable so that their dates of arrival (which steam ships had started to guarantee) were of less importance. Finally as the Panama Canal was opened, sailing ships were used in parts of the world where steam ships still found it hard to operate, mainly on:

- the Chilean nitrate trade (for fertilizers and explosive production in Europe), and on
- the Australian grain trade.

Both Chilean and Australian ports were difficult to supply with coal for steamships to refuel. Also, both routes to Europe went round Cape Horn. The end of the First World War saw a brief return to profitability as all ship types were in scarce supply due to wartime losses but that boom became bust as many new steam ships were built to replace the sailing ships that were lost.

== Genesis in the 1930s ==
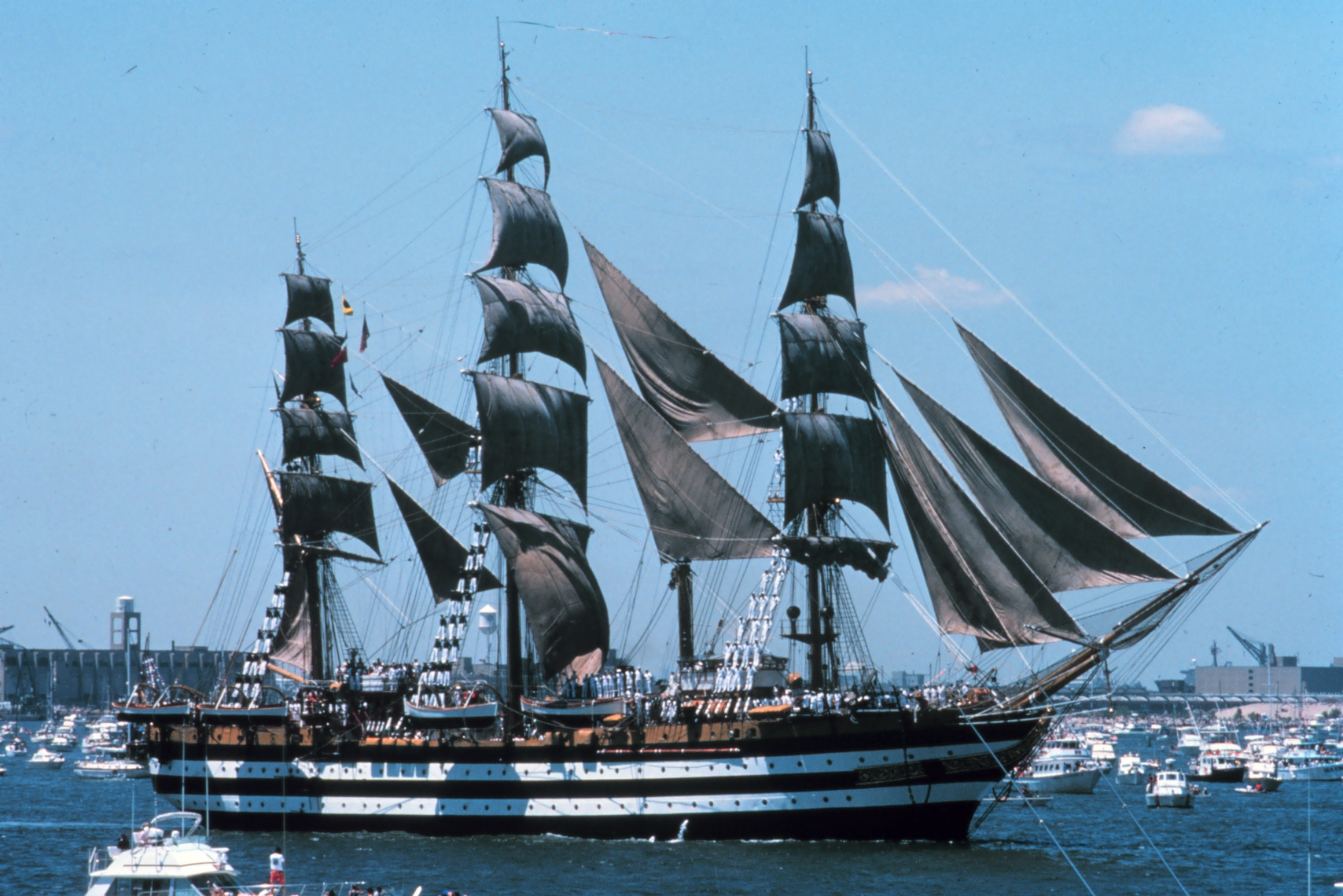
Italian training ship Amerigo Vespucci, launched in 1931.

While many countries of the world operated sailing ships as training ships for officers in their merchant marine in the 1920s and 30s, several sailing ship owners such as Carl Laeisz and Gustaf Erikson determined that there was still a profit to be made from the last of the sailing ships.

Erikson purchased existing ships that required the minimum of capital investment and repaired them with parts cannibalised from other ships. Identifying the bulk cargo routes that would still offer paying freights, he manned the ships with a smattering of paid experienced officers.

Some of the deckhands were apprentices from steamship lines and other adventurous youth who had paid a premium to sail while being trained, some recruited for very modest salaries. The apprentices were considered trainees and were the first formalization of sail trainers with crew drawn from members of the public who just went for the adventure, as opposed to a career.

With manning costs netted out on Erikson's balance sheet, the ships continued to return a paper profit. However Erikson was under no illusions as to the long term profitability of his venture, which depended on ignoring the depreciation on his ships and a shrinking supply of sound hulls and rigs. The company would use their profits to diversify into steam after the Second World War. While the shipping companies of Erickson and F. Laeisz gradually turned to steam, the next generation of captains were climbing up the hawsehole and taking command of their own vessels, redefining sail training as a purely educational endeavour with trainees as the cargo.

From 1932 through 1958, Irving Johnson and his wife Electa circumnavigated the world seven times with amateur youth crews on board their vessels named Yankee. Over the years, their voyages were featured in books they authored, and in National Geographic magazines and TV specials like "Irving Johnson, High Seas Adventurer". Their archives are at Mystic Seaport, Connecticut.

Australian Alan Villiers purchased the old school ship George Stage from Denmark in 1934. Renaming her the Joseph Conrad, he sailed her round the world with no paying cargo and a crew of youth who had paid to be there. He also took as many non-paying youth as he could afford to fit in the budget, those he considered at risk on the streets of their inner cities and in need of what was then called "character building". These trips were the genesis of current modern sail training, using manually operated ships and the harsh discipline imposed by the sea to further personal development and taking those disadvantaged by circumstance to benefit from the experience.

By the end of the Second World War, the numbers of traditionally rigged sailing ships left were dwindling and public interest waned. After the German school ship Niobe sank in 1932, killing 69, the loss of Pamir in 1957 and Albatross in 1961 drew further ill will and seemed to signal the end of an era.

== Modern sail training ==
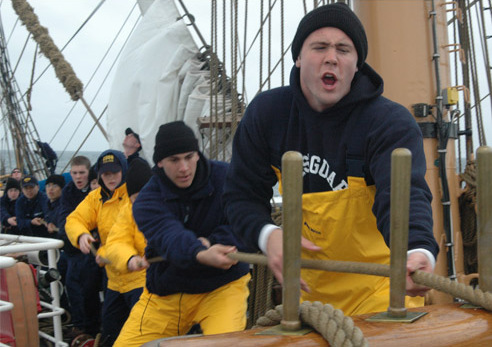
Cadets man headsails sheets aboard USCGC Eagle

In what was conceived to be last great gathering of square-riggers under sail, Bernard Morgan and Greville Howard persuaded a number of ship owners to join together in a sort of farewell salute in 1956, organizing a race from Torbay on the South Coast of England to race informally across the Bay of Biscay to Lisbon in Portugal. Five square rigged school ships entered the race, Denmark's Danmark, Norway's Christian Radich and Sorlandet, Belgium's Mercator and Portugal's first Sagres. The vessels met again the following year and every year since in an annual series that would astonish its original organizers today. Old vessels were saved or repaired and new purpose built sail training vessels were commissioned. With renewed interest in the age of sail, national sail training associations affiliated to Sail Training International (STI) (formerly "Sail Training Association") were organized and large summer events find upwards of 100 ships racing across the oceans.

Crew exchanges allow young people from one country to sail with those from another. Long before the end of the Cold War, ships from Russia and Poland (which in some cases had been built in Germany) joined the International Fleet in 1974. A limited exchange between the East and West was initiated. One of the largest of the affiliate organizations of the STI is the American Sail Training Association (ASTA). Founded in 1973 with a handful of vessels, it has since grown to encompass an international organization with more than 250 tall ships representing 25 different countries. The UK National Member of STI is the Association of Sail Training Organisations (ASTO) Founded in 1972, http://www.asto.org.uk

Square rigged seamanship was in danger of becoming a lost art. As the 1997 restoration of USS Constitution neared completion, the United States Navy called on the crew of HMS Bounty to train her sailors to sail the vessel as originally intended.

Many boats are historical vessels and replicas which require coordinated manual labor to sail, operating in the original tradition proposed by Alan Villiers and Irving Johnson such as the Picton Castle while others are purpose built educational platforms carrying out scientific research under sail such as Robert C. Seamans and Corwith Cramer of the Sea Education Association. Another new direction is the development of floating maritime heritage centres, connected to a sail training organisation, and often in co-ordination with land based maritime museums. Tall Ship Atyla is one such example of this, with visitors to the Bilbao Maritime Museum enjoying free entry to the ship during the winter months when she is moored nearby. As the crew of the Irving Johnson and the award-winning program at the Los Angeles Maritime Institute like to say "We do not train youth for a life at sea ... we use the sea to educate youth for life".

== Vessel classifications ==
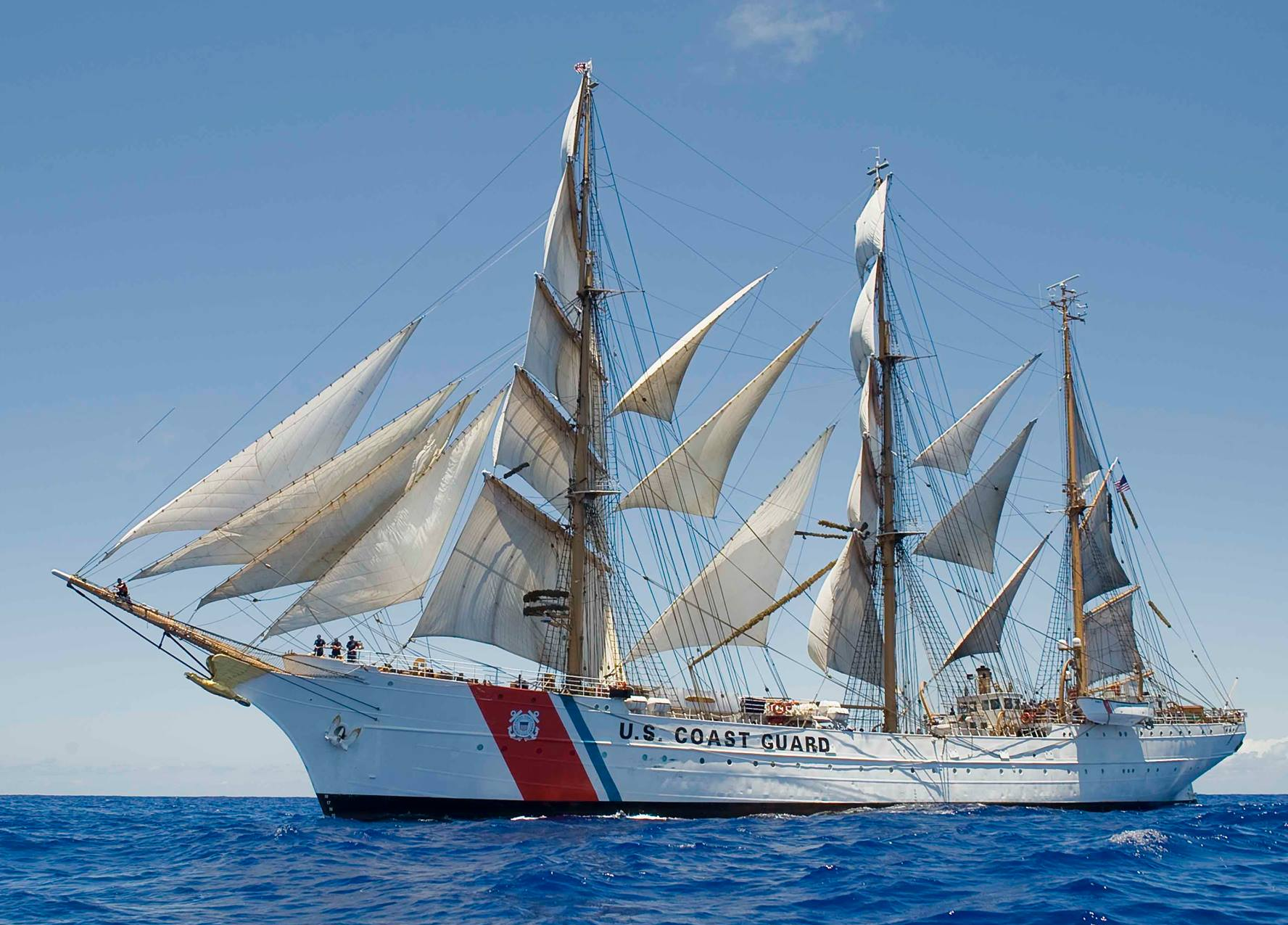
USCGC Eagle, a barque

Tall ships have been found to be effective platforms for sail training as they combine many elements fundamental to sail training. A "tall ship" is not a strictly defined type of vessel. The term is commonly used today to define a large, traditionally rigged vessel, whether or not is it technically a full-rigged ship. For example, USCGC Eagle is technically a barque. A tall ship is usually defined by the topmast and topsails she carries as opposed to the modern high-aspect-ratio rigs and marconi mains carried by the sloops and yawls seen in every harbor today.

For the purpose of classification and race rating, the STI divides tall ships into the following classes :

Class A: All vessels over 160 feet in length overall, regardless of rig, and square rigged vessels over 120 feet in length.
Class A; Division II: All square rigged vessels less than 120 feet in length.
Class B: Fore-and-aft rigged vessels between 100 feet and 160 feet in length
Class C: All other fore-and-aft rigged vessels at least 30 feet long at the waterline.

The United States Coast Guard classifies vessels based on their intended use and structure, prescribing requirements for captain and crew manning, waters the vessel may operate in, number of passengers allowed and minimum safety equipment required.

With the exception of uninspected vessels, all such vessels are inspected annually and issued a Certificate of Inspection (COI) which must be displayed on the vessel and spells out the requirements that vessel must maintain.

Sailing School Vessel (SSV): Inspected under Title 46, Subchapter R of the Code of Federal Regulations (CFR). An SSV is a vessel of less than 500 gross tons carrying six or more sailing school students or instructors, primarily propelled by sail, and operated by a nonprofit educational organization exclusively for the purpose of sailing education.

Passenger Vessel: Certified according to the size and number of passengers (not engaged in educational activities or in the operation of the vessel) carried under Title 46 of the CFR.

Subchapter C: Uninspected vessels which operate with no more than six passengers.
Subchapter T: Small passenger vessels of under 100 gross tons that carry more than six passengers and are required to pass regular USCG inspection of the ship and all onboard equipment.
Subchapter K: Small passenger vessels of under 100 gross tons that carry more than 150 passengers and are required to pass regular USCG inspection of the ship and all onboard equipment.
Subchapter H: Passenger vessels of more than 100 gross tons that carry passengers for hire and are required to pass regular USCG inspection of the ship and all onboard equipment.

Attraction Vessel: Certification is required whenever a vessel is open to public boarding or conducts dockside programs. The vessel may be permanently moored to a pier, or it may be certified under one or more of the above subchapters, but the Attraction Vessel COI certifies its safety for dockside and visitation only.

Oceanographic Research Vessel (ORV): Certified under Subchapter U of Title 46 of the CFR. An ORV is a vessel employed exclusively in either oceanographic (saltwater) or limnologic (freshwater) instruction and/or research, and is not necessarily equipped for passengers or other non-professionals.

== See also ==
- Outdoor education
- Sailing
- Tall ships
- Training ship
