= Calvary at Pleyben =

Coordinates: 48.226757°N 3.969879°E

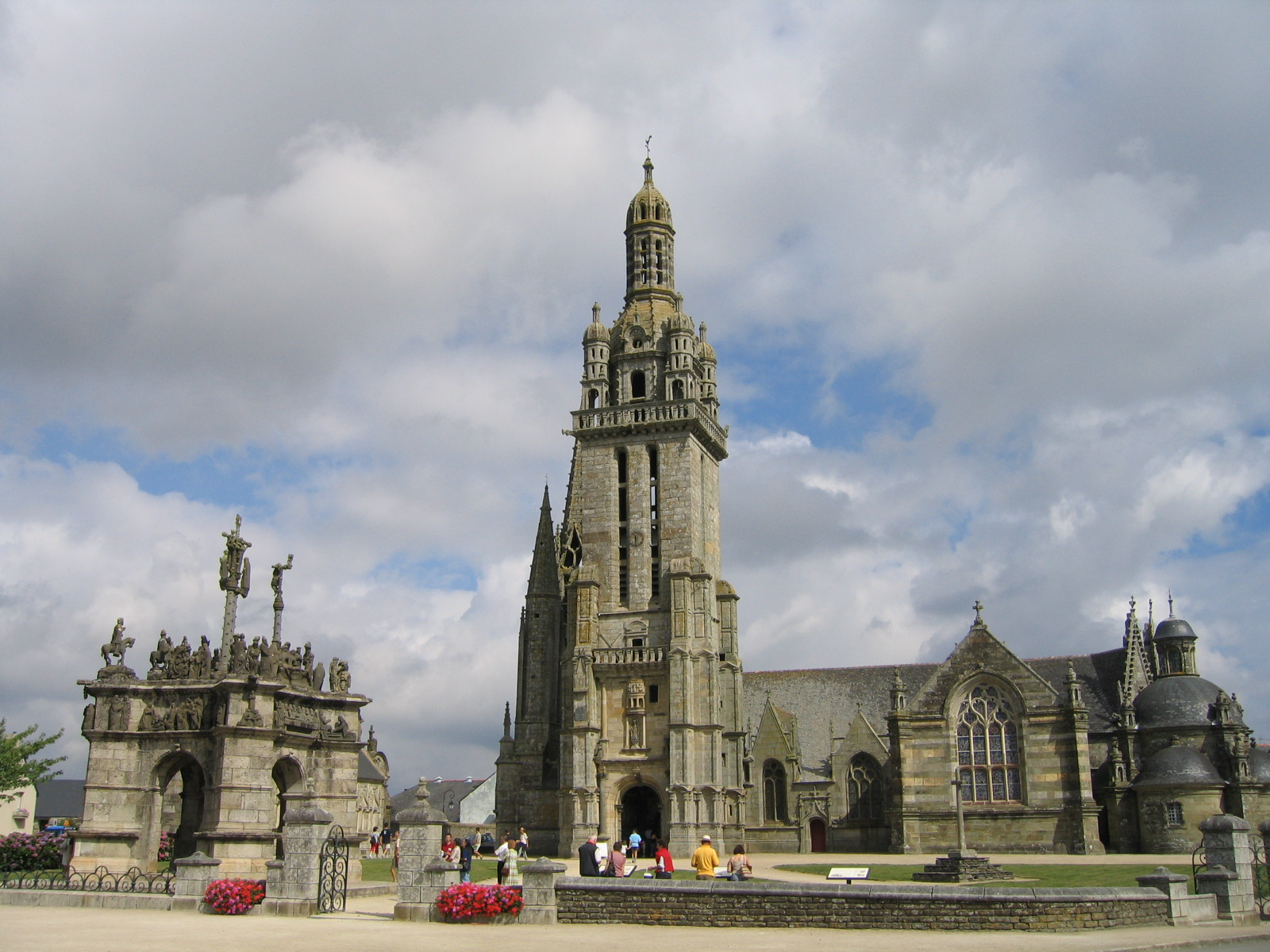
The calvary stands close to the 16th-century church

The Calvary at Pleyben, dating from 1555, is located in the village of Pleyben in Brittany, northwestern France.

== Background ==
The Calvary dates to 1555 and most of the sculpture involved was executed by the workshop of Henry and Bastien Prigent who also worked on the Plougonven and Lopérec calvaries. Originally a statue of St Germain had been part of the calvary but this was moved to the church porch. This statue is inscribed "EN L´HONNEUR DE DIEV ET (NOTRE) DA (M) E ET MONSIEUR S GERMAIN CESTE CROIX FVST COME (N) CE 1555" and this has been used to fix the calvary's date. In 1650, it was enriched by the addition of several new sculptures including the Entry into Jerusalem, the Last Supper and the scene where Jesus is washing Peter's feet. These were the work of the Yves Ozanne studio/workshop in Brest. Originally it was placed near the church porch but between 1738 and 1742, it was moved to improve access to the church. This work was carried out by the Pleyben entrepreneurs, Guillaume Le Goff, Yves Quiniou and François Motreff, and it is thought that at this time the structure could well have been modified and enlarged. The calvary has been restored on several occasions notably in 1953 and more recently in the years 1980 to 1990. The granite used came from a quarry near Gulvain.

It has two distinct levels. The lower level comprises a corniche running around the entire structure and the upper level or platform. Four buttresses strengthen the calvary and an arcaded passage runs through the centre producing an Arc de Triomphe like effect. The statuary decorating the calvary, placed either on the platform or on the corniche, is carved from kersanton stone or in some cases from grey arkos, a stone less resilient to erosion. The calvary should be read anti-clockwise starting with the Annunciation on the corniche of the southwest buttress and ending with the Crown of thorns episode, whereas on the platform, one's reading should start with the "Ecce Homo" scene and finish with the "Descent into Hell". The "Mise au tombeau" is placed in the centre. The sculptures on the lower level (the corniche) are smaller than those on the platform.

== The actual Calvary ==
On the south facing corniche, the statuary covers the Annunciation, the Visitation (Christianity), the Nativity of Jesus, the Adoration of the Magi and the Flight into Egypt with a scene showing Jesus meeting the lawyers placed in the southeast corner. On the east facing corniche, the statuary covers the Entry into Jerusalem, the Last Supper and the Foot washing. On the north face corniche, the statuary covers Jesus in Gethsemane, scenes around Jesus' arrest, and his appearance before Pontius Pilate. On the northwest corner corniche is a Pietà and then on the east face corniche is a depiction of Jesus being mocked ("Christ aux outrages") followed by Peter's denial, Jesus' flagellation and the scene where a crown of thorns is pressed on Jesus' head. On the calvary's upper surface (the platform) southeast corner is the scene depicting the "Ecce Homo" with Pontius Pilate wearing a Phylactery inscribed "ECCE HOMO" and pointing to Jesus and one of Jesus' accusers whose Phylactery reads "TOLLE TOLLE CRVCIFIGE EVM". He asks that Jesus be crucified. On the northeast corner of the platform, Pontius Pilate is depicted washing his hands. On the north face part of the platform is the scene showing Christ carrying the cross.

== The summit ==
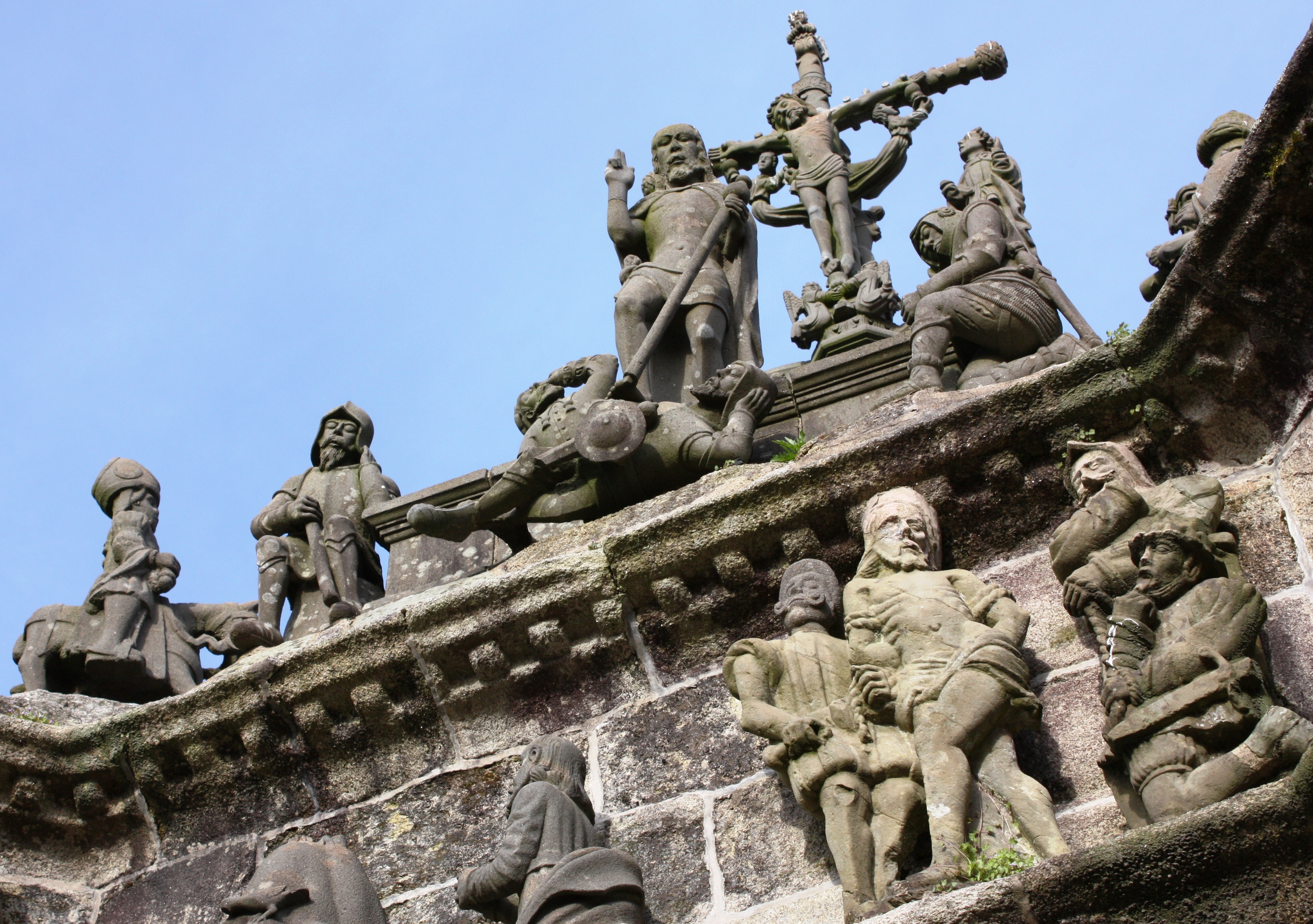
A view looking up to Jesus on the cross. Below, the "risen" Jesus emerges in triumph from his tomb stepping past two sleeping guards and another, who has fallen to the ground, is shielding his eyes, astonished by what he is seeing. Part of the lower frieze can be seen, this holding the depiction of Jesus being mocked and to the left we see the top of St Peter's head. He had just denied Jesus and kneels in prayer asking forgiveness

From the centre of the platform, three crosses reach up to the sky and on the central cross, Jesus is surrounded by five angels, four of whom collect the blood from his wounds whilst the fifth is ready to carry off his soul. On the reverse side is a depiction of "Christ triumphant" who holds up his right hand whilst his left hand draws attention to the wound in his side. On the two smaller crosses are the two robbers whose legs have been broken to hasten their death, inscriptions identify the Penitent thief as "Dismas" and the Impenitent thief as "Gismas." An angel is ready to take the good robber's soul to heaven whilst a grimacing demon is ready to take the soul of the bad robber. There are statues of the Virgin Mary and John the Evangelist at the base of the cross. Mary's face is bathed in tears whilst John looks up towards Jesus, his left hand raised.

== The west face ==
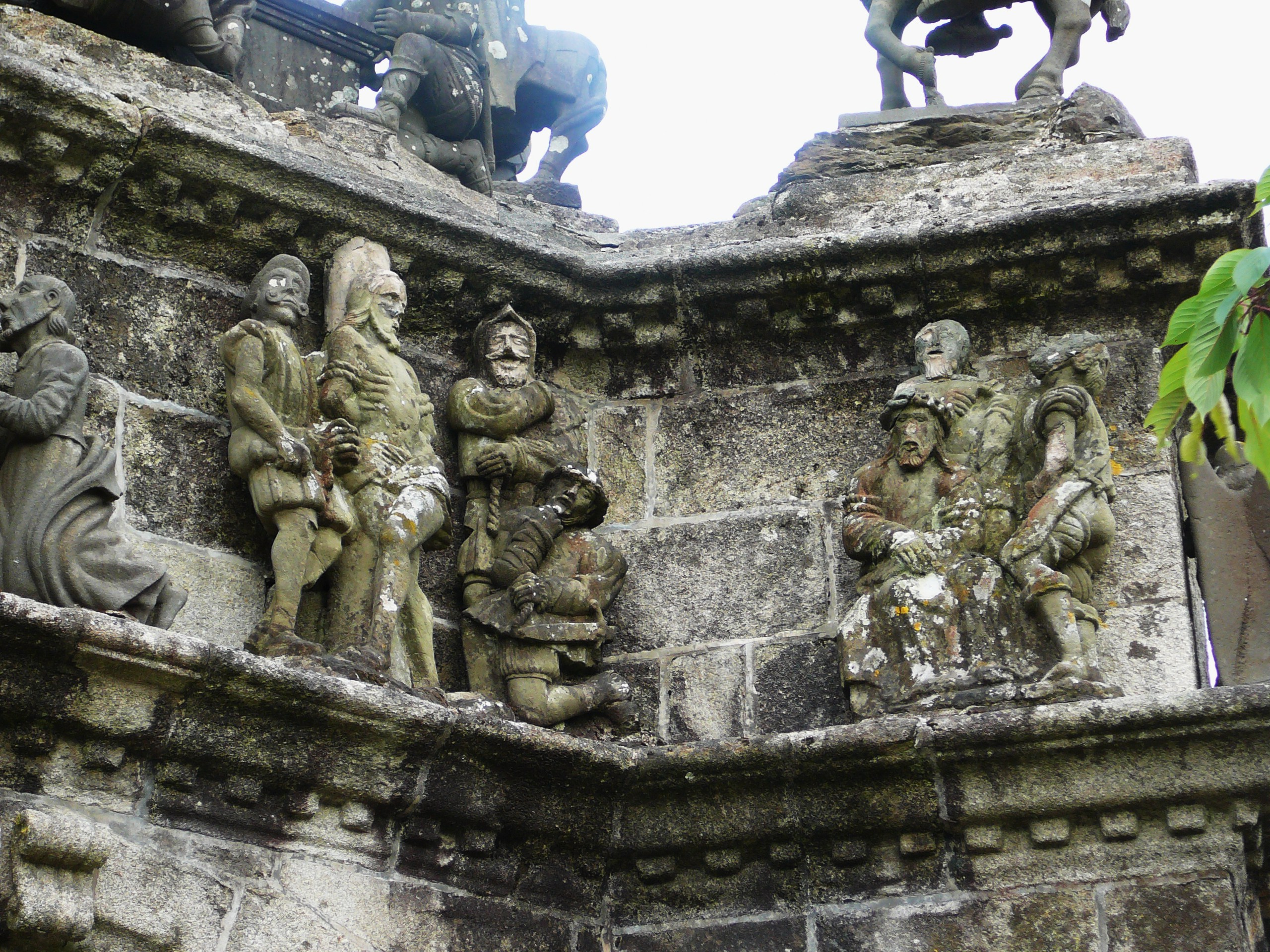
On the far left we see Peter kneeling and praying after his denial of Jesus, then we see Jesus being flogged and finally the scene where the crown of thorns is forced down onto Jesus' head.

There are statues of seven cavaliers/soldiers spread about the calvary's platform including Saint Longinus who carries a lance. The main depiction on the west face covers the Resurrection of Jesus with Jesus emerging from the tomb. Around him two soldiers are seen to be sleeping whilst a third, blinded by the scene unfolding before him, shields his eyes as he falls to the ground. On the corniche below and on the side of the buttress is a pietà which, according to the inscription, was added in 1738. Then we see the scene where Jesus is mocked by two soldiers and a blindfold is about to be put over his eyes ("Christ aux outrages"). This is followed by a depiction showing the Denial of Peter. Peter kneels in prayer before a rock on which two birds are perched. Old postcard photographs show that the image of a rooster once topped the rock but this has disappeared. Of Breton's great calvaries only that at Pleyben deals with Peter's denial of Christ. Then we see Jesus being flogged by three soldiers, this scene followed by his being crowned with a crown of thorns.

- In the resurrection scene, two guards are shown sleeping, a third shields his eyes unable to comprehend what he is seeing and a fourth has fallen to the ground.
- Above the Pietả is a canopy sculpted by the Prigent brothers which has three niches in which there are depictions of two women and a man wearing a feather plumed hat in the central niche.
- In the scene where Christ is being mocked, he sits with hands tied whilst one of the two guards is about to blindfold him.
- In the flagellation scene Jesus is tied with rope to a column and is surrounded by three soldiers who carry out his flogging.

== The north face ==
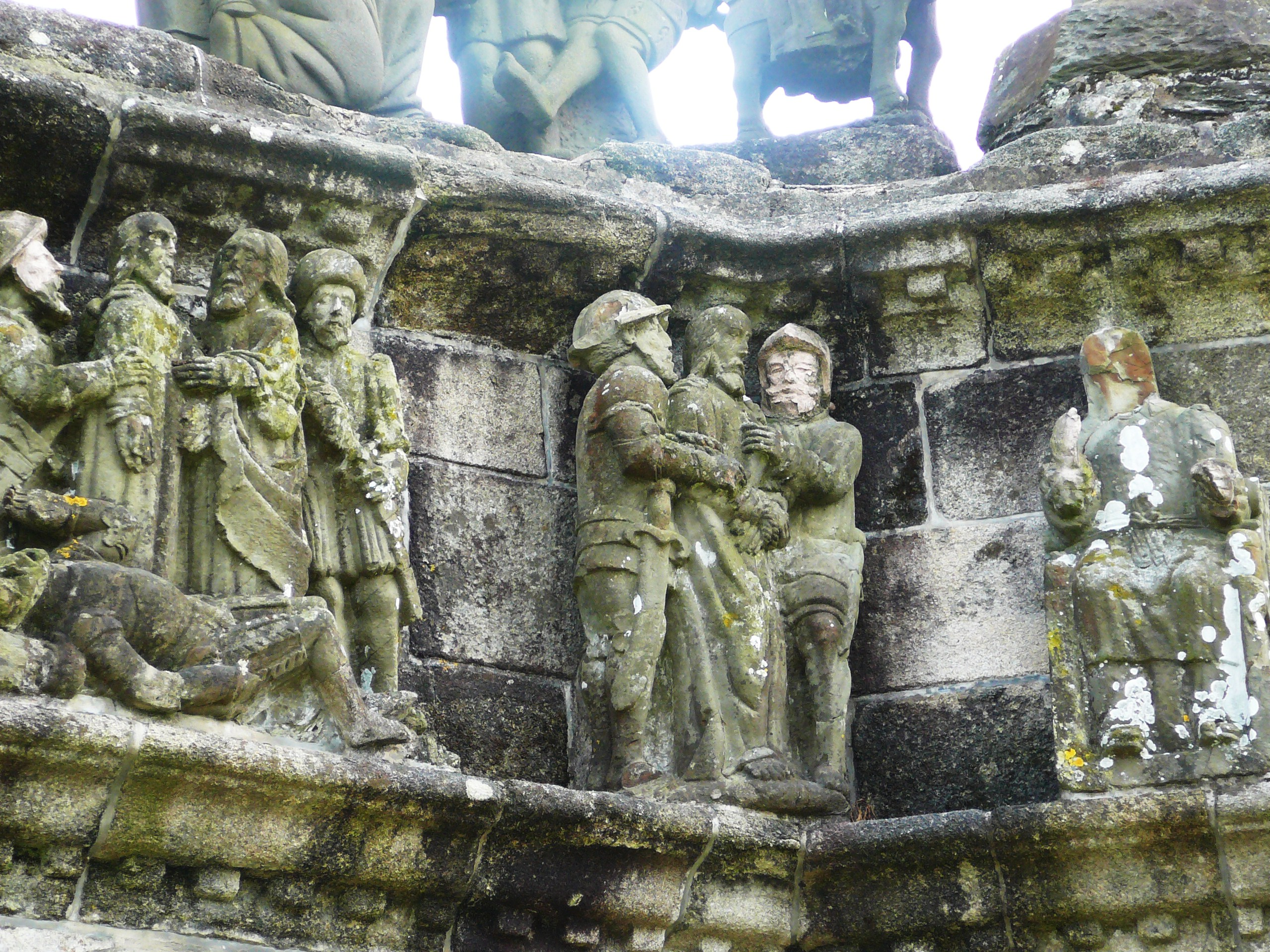
On the left we see Jesus' arrest. Malchus lies on the ground having been attacked by Peter. We then see Jesus held by two soldiers and being brought before Caiaphas who sits on his throne.

Along the corniche on this face of Pleyben's calvary, we commence on the left side with a scene showing Jesus at prayer in the garden of Gethsemane. John the Evangelist and St Peter are with him but both are asleep. The statue of the kneeling Jesus has now lost its head. We then see Peter standing alone, his sword hanging at his side followed by a depiction of Jesus being arrested. Judas has kissed Jesus to identify him to the guards and he stands clutching a purse and in the ensuing melée, the guard Malchus has been knocked to the ground having been hit with his sword by Peter. In the next scene Jesus is being presented to the High Priest Caiaphas who sits on his throne. On the northeast corner of the north face platform we see Jesus being brought before Pontius Pilate. In the Christ carrying the cross scene which follows and dominates the north face, we start on the right hand side with a depiction of Longinus who leads the procession although confusingly he faces the wrong way. He points to his eye with his finger reminding us that Jesus had cured his blindness. Jesus is clearly struggling with the weight of the cross and Simon of Cyrene tries to help keep it off the ground. In front a soldier is putting his fingers in his mouth to whistle, another soldier pulls on a rope whilst a third, walking behind Jesus, lashes him with a whip. All are frowning except for Jesus whose face remains impassive, his head leaning to one side. St John and the Virgin Mary follow Jesus and the soldiers and John is trying to support Mary. Finally, St Veronica holds out her veil which is now impregnated with Jesus' image. On the corniche we have a scene showing Jesus praying in Gethsemane, then St Peter shown with his sword followed by a scene showing Jesus being kissed by Judas who holds his purse and then arrested with Peter attacking Malchus. We next see Jesus presented to the High Priest Caiaphas who sits on his throne and we then return to the Annunciation.

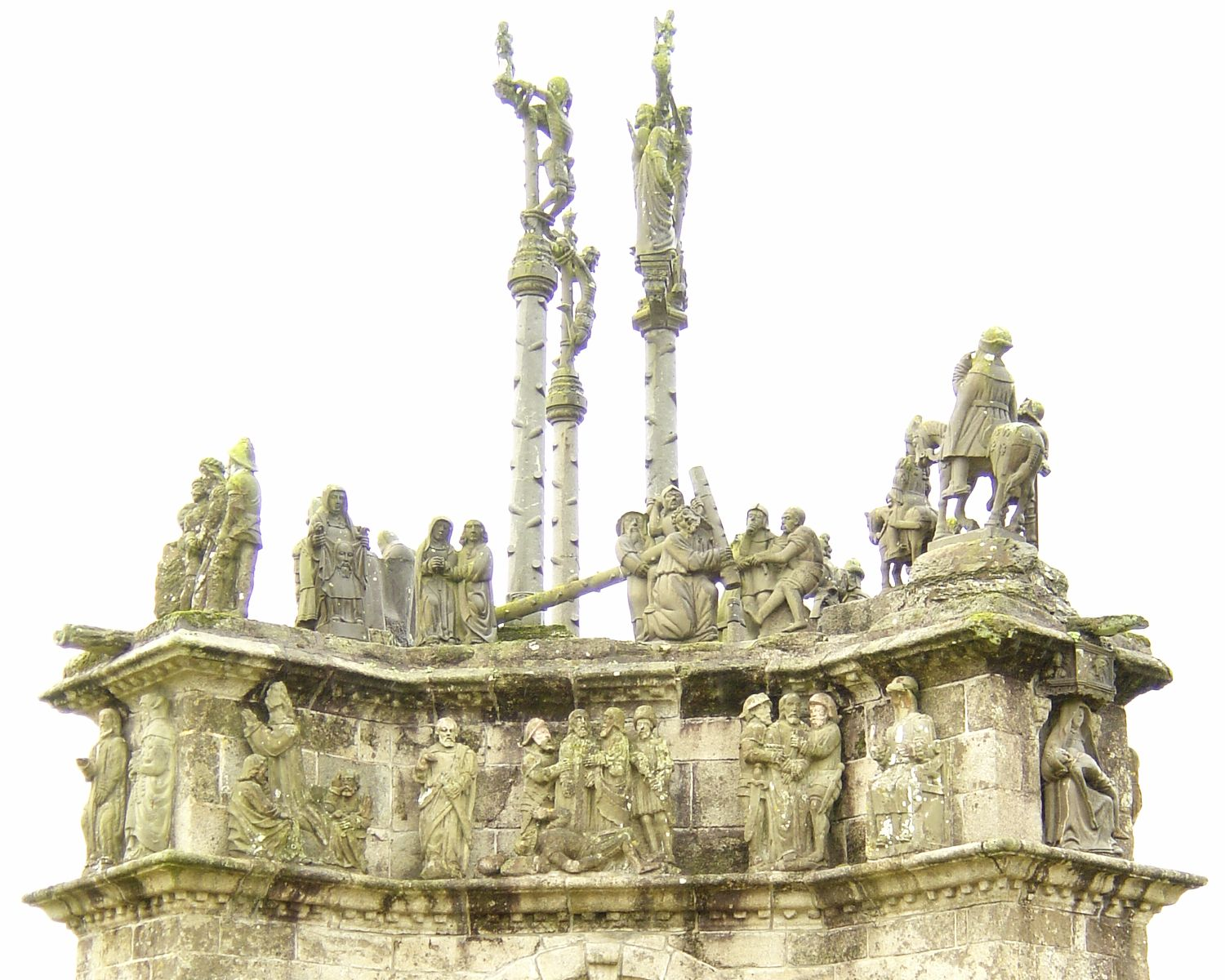
View of the north face. We see Jesus on his knees praying in Gethsemane, his two companions sleeping, then Peter standing his sword visible, and a scene depicting the arrest. Then on the far right we see Jesus brought before Caiaphas. On the buttress to the right is the pietà and on the buttress to the left Jesus' temptation by Satan. The platform above is dominated by the depiction of Jesus carrying the cross to Calvary.

== The south face ==
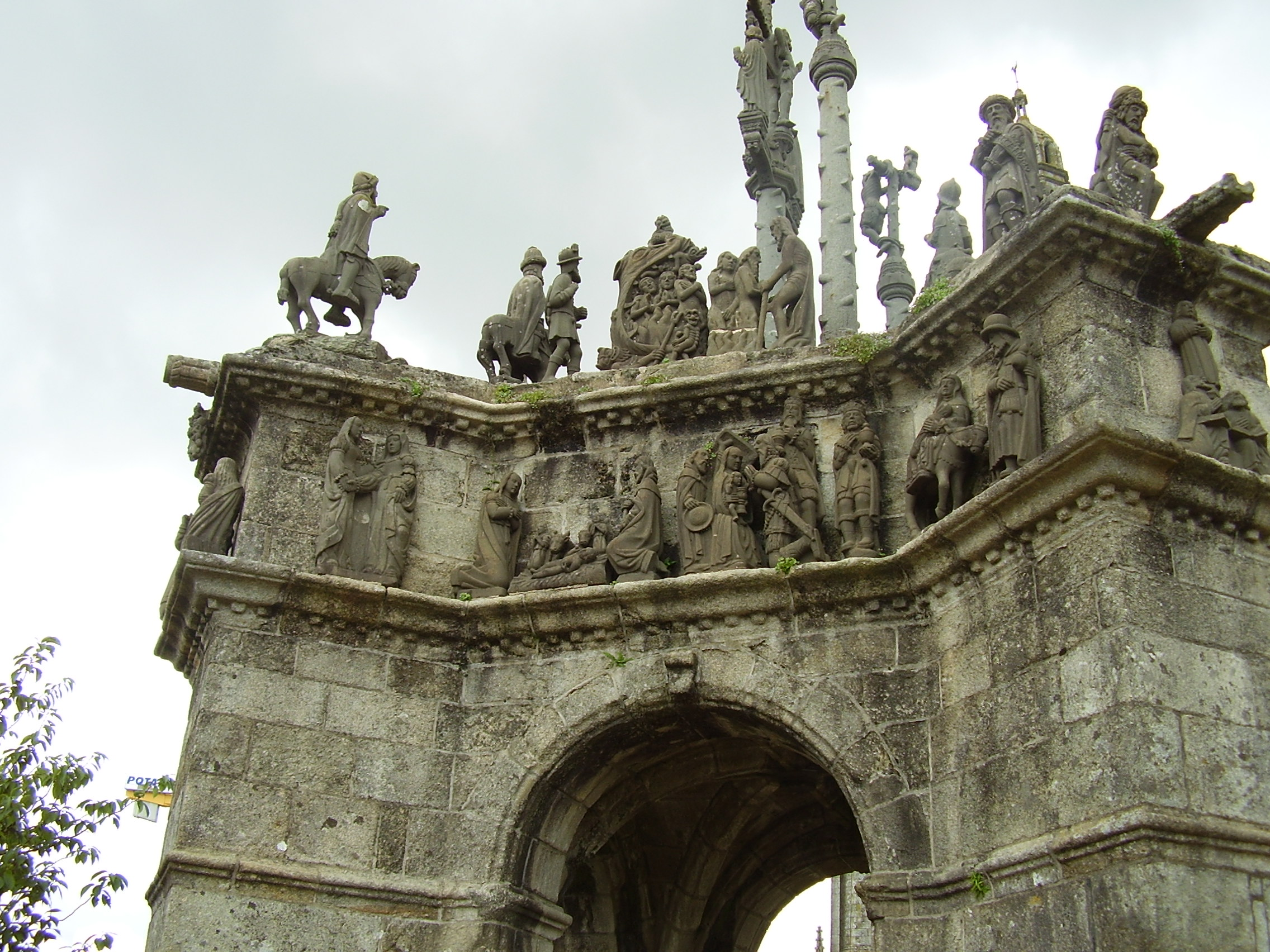
A view of the south face. On the left side of the corniche we see the Visitation with Saint Elizabeth reaching out to touch the Virgin Mary's stomach then the nativity scene with Mary and Joseph kneeling before the baby Jesus who lies before two small angels and the ass and the cow. This is followed by the Adoration of the Magi and then the Flight into Egypt. Finally on the end of the next buttress we see Jesus depicted in the temple in conversation with two lawyers. Jesus stands on a dias so he effectively looks down on the two lawyers. In the centre of the platform above we see the scene depicting the Harrowing of Hell with Jesus leading Adam and Eve from the "Mouth of Hell" in which some of the damned can be seen along with a devil armed with a fork. Then we see a Jew holding the scroll containing details of the charges being leveled against Jesus and finally a soldier dressing Christ in his "royal robe."

On the platform of the south facing side of the calvary after some soldiers, depicted standing or on horseback we have the scene depicting the descent into Limbo where Hell is a large open mouth from which Jesus has already led out Adam and Eve and still visible in the mouth are further lost souls held in check by a devil wielding a fork. The mouth is toothless but various imps and demons are also revealed. Jesus holds a pilgrim's staff to underline the length of the journey he has made to reach this place. To the right of the entry into Limbo scene we see another horsed soldier and then the solitary figure of a Jew holding a scroll containing the text of the accusation being made against Jesus. Finally on the right-hand side of the platform there is a soldier dressing Jesus in a "regal robe". Beneath the platform and on the south facing corniche we start on the left-hand side with the Annunciation. There is a visitation scene with Elizabeth meeting with the Virgin Mary. They discuss their mutual pregrancies and Elizabeth tenderly lays her hand on Mary's stomach. The next scene is the Nativity with Joseph and Mary kneeling on either side of the baby Jesus. Further spectators look on in the shape of two small angels and the ass and the cow. This leads on to the scene depicting the Adoration of the Magi, followed by a depiction of the Flight into Egypt and finally on the outside of the buttress to the right we have the scene showing Jesus in discussion with two lawyers. The sculpture of Elizabeth meeting with Mary was the work of Henry Prigent as was the nativity scene whilst Bastien Prigent sculpted the scene depicting the visit of the three wise men. In this scene the characters wear the dress worn in the reign of Henry II. All three wear capes except for Melchior who kneels before the baby Jesus, his hands joined together and with a sword at his side. He has lain his crown on the ground. In the Flight into Egypt, Joseph carries a moneybag and a pilgrim's staff to remind us that he is starting out on a long journey. He also wears the round pilgrim's hat that he is wearing in the "Adoration of the Magi" scene. In the scene with the two lawyers the sculptor shows that Jesus is speaking by depicting him with his right index finger placed on the left thumb. Henry Prigent was the sculptor of this scene. He puts Jesus on a pedestal so that he stands above and looking down on the lawyers.

- The Archangel Gabriel kneels before the Virgin Mary in the Annunciation scene. Around his left arm is a banner which states "AVE GRATIA PLENA" ("Hail, full of Grace"). Mary kneels at a Prie-dieu.
- In the nativity scene, Mary and Joseph kneel on either side of the baby Jesus who lies on some straw. Also looking on are two angels, who are kneeling, their hands clasped in prayer and the ass and the cow. Their sculptures are as small in scale as the baby Jesus. The baby Jesus holds a small terrestrial globe in his left hand.
- In the Adoration of the Magi scene, Mary is seated with Joseph standing behind her holding his hat in his right hand. Mary has the baby on her lap and is holding both the baby and the gift which one of the three wise men has given them. He kneels before them, his hands clasped together and his sword slung at his side whilst the other two wise men stand to the rear holding their gifts which are also contained in pots.
- In the scene depicting Jesus with the two lawyers they are kneeling with open books on their laps and look up to Jesus who is standing on a pedestal and so dominates the scene.

== The east face ==
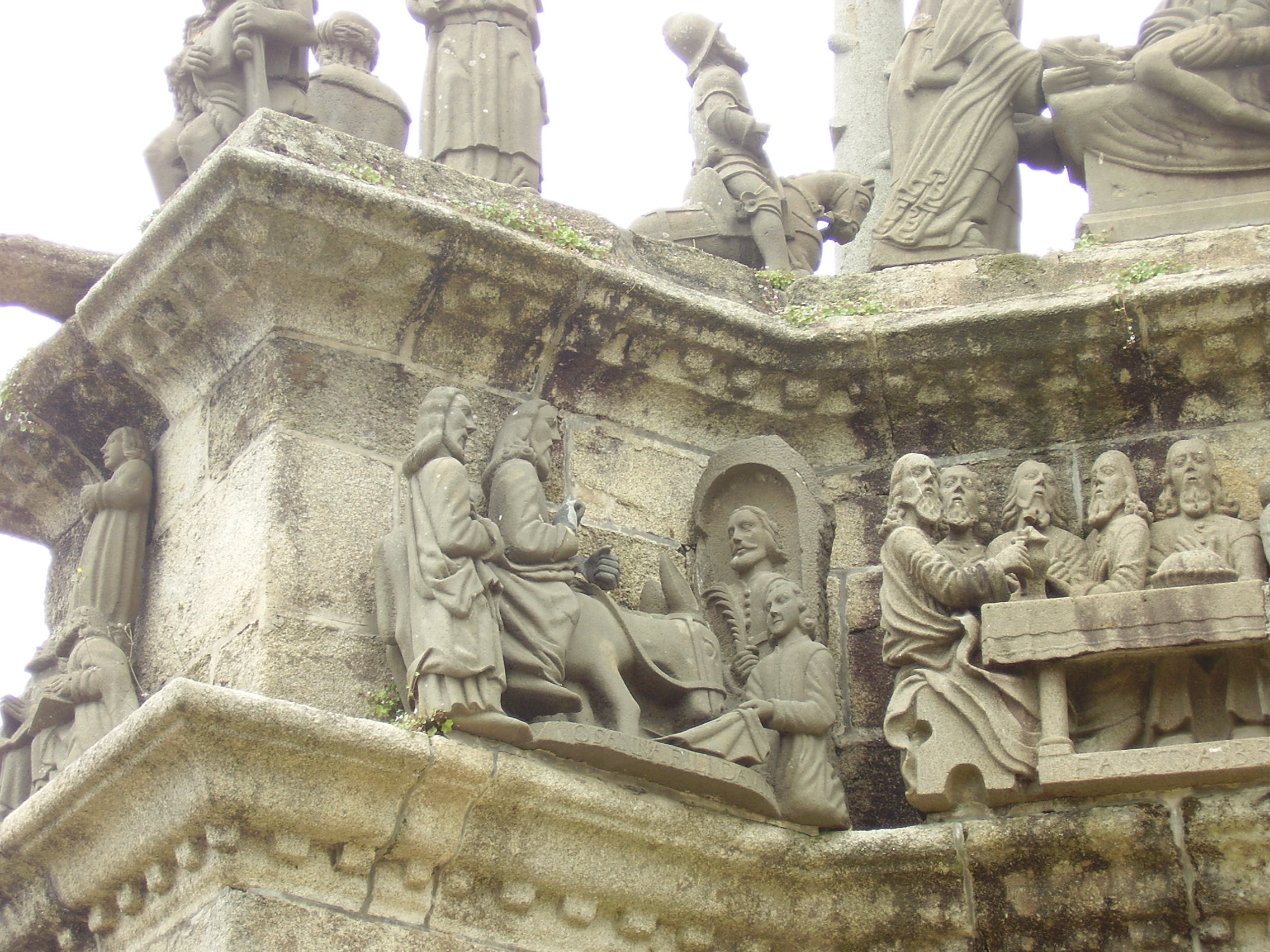
The entry into Jerusalem/Palm Sunday. The sculptor suggests the gates of Jerusalem by his depiction of a doorway to the right. In this doorway, one man holds a palm and the second lays down a rug by way of a welcome. To the right we see the beginning of the scene depicting the "Last supper". Under the ass we see the words "Hossana fili David".

On the platform, after seeing the depiction of Jesus being dressed in his robe, and a Jew holding the text of Jesus' accusation, we have a "Mise au tombeau". Present at this ceremony are Nicodemus and Joseph of Arimathea, the Virgin Mary and St John, Mary Magdalene holding a pot of ointment, Mary Cleophas, Mary Salome and a Jew who is shown to be speaking by placing his index finger on his thumb. Then we have the "Ecce Homo" scene with Pontius Pilate shown washing his hands, with Jesus held by soldiers standing at his side. On the corniche below we have a scene showing Jesus speaking with the lawyers on the left side buttress and then the Entry into Jerusalem with the inscription "Hossana fili David" this followed by a depiction of the Last Supper with Judas Iscariot on the right holding his purse. We then see Jesus washing St Peter's feet, followed on the buttress to the right by a scene depictig the temptation of Christ with the devil bearded with claws and with large ears.

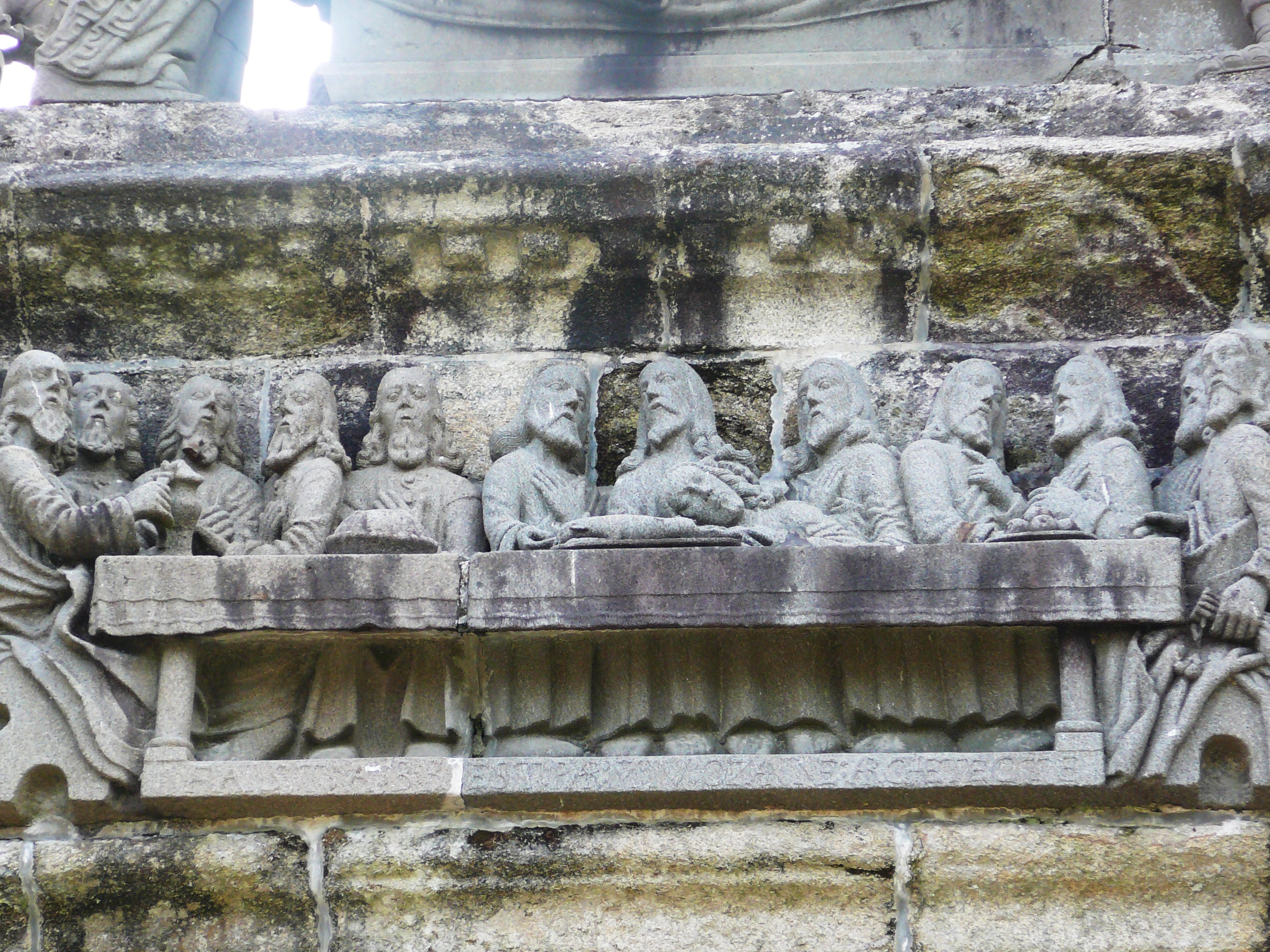
The Last Supper

- In the scene where Pilate is washing his hands a servant stands before him with a wash basin and towel. Jesus is being led away by two soldiers.
- In the "Mise au tombeau" the sculptor has created tears running down the faces of the women present.

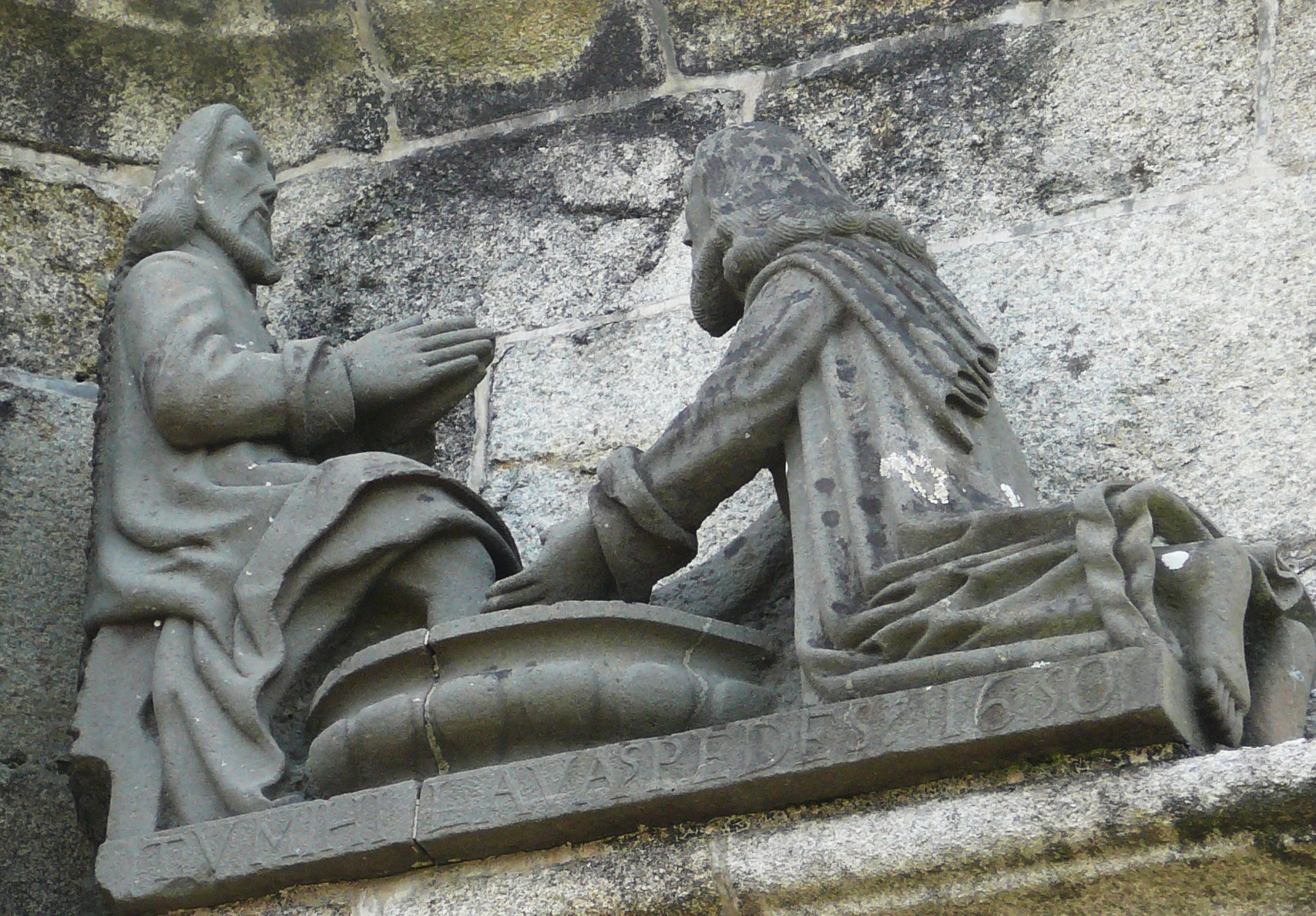
Jesus washing St Peter's feet

- The "Ecce Homo" sequence at Pleyben is in three distinct sections. In the first the seated and turbaned Pontius Pilate is pointing to Jesus who seems resigned to what is happened and his head is bowed and his hands tied in front. The crown of thorns is on Jesus' head. A soldier stands to the rear and in the right a Jewish priest unrolls the scroll containing details of the charge made against Jesus "Tolle Tolle Crucifige eum"-"Take him out and crucify him!".
- In the scene depicting the "Last Supper" eleven of the disciples sit upright at the table and one lies across Jesus. On the table is a dish containing the pascal lamb, a plate of apples and a cake or pie. Judas Iscariot sits at the end of the table on the right. His left arm hangs below the table and is holding a purse. Along the base of the table is the inscription "FAIST A BREST PAR MIV OZANNE ARCHETECTE".
- In the scene where Jesus is washing Peter's feet there is an inscription below the sculpture which reads "TV MIHI LAVAS PEDES 1650".

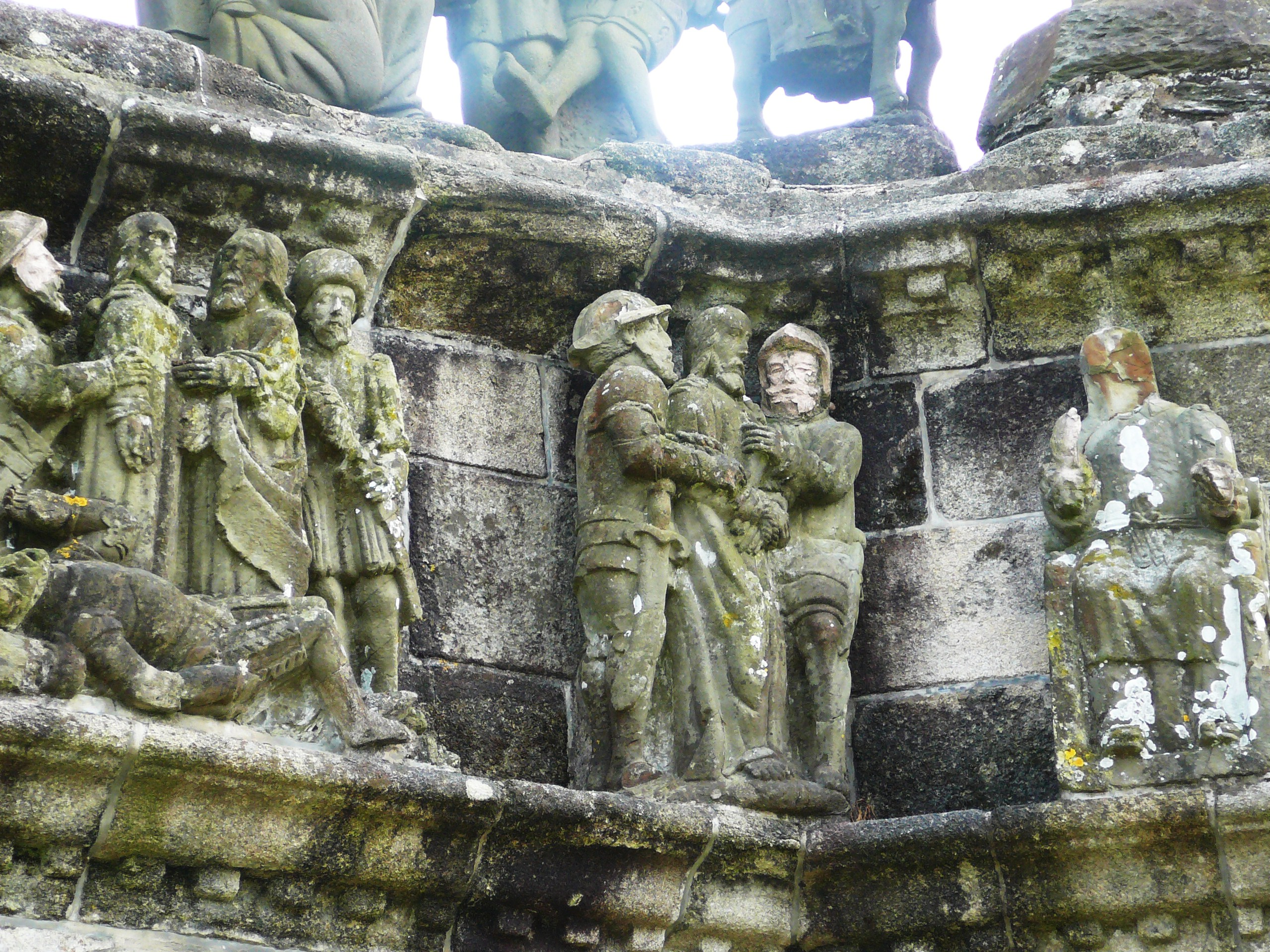
On the left we see Jesus' arrest followed by his presentation to the High Priest seated on his throne. Jesus is held by two soldiers.

== See also ==
- List of the works of Bastien and Henry Prigent

== Notes ==
Note 1: Apart from the Prigent brothers and their team of masons, a major contribution was made to the Pleyben calvary by a sculptor who is known as "Le compagnon de Pleyben". This third sculptor worked in grey sandstone rather than kersantite. The contributions were the heads of the soldiers and the Jewish priest in the "Ecce Homo" scene, Jesus and the devil in the scene depicting the devil tempting Jesus, Saint Peter in the scene depicting the agony in the garden of Gethsemane, all the figures in Jesus' arrest other than Jesus himself, the figures apart from Jesus in the scene depicting the appearance before Caiaphas, all the characters in the "Christ aux outrages" except for Jesus himself, the figures in the flagellation scene apart from Jesus and those in the scene depicting the crown of thorns being applied to Jesus' head again other than Jesus himself.

== Gallery ==
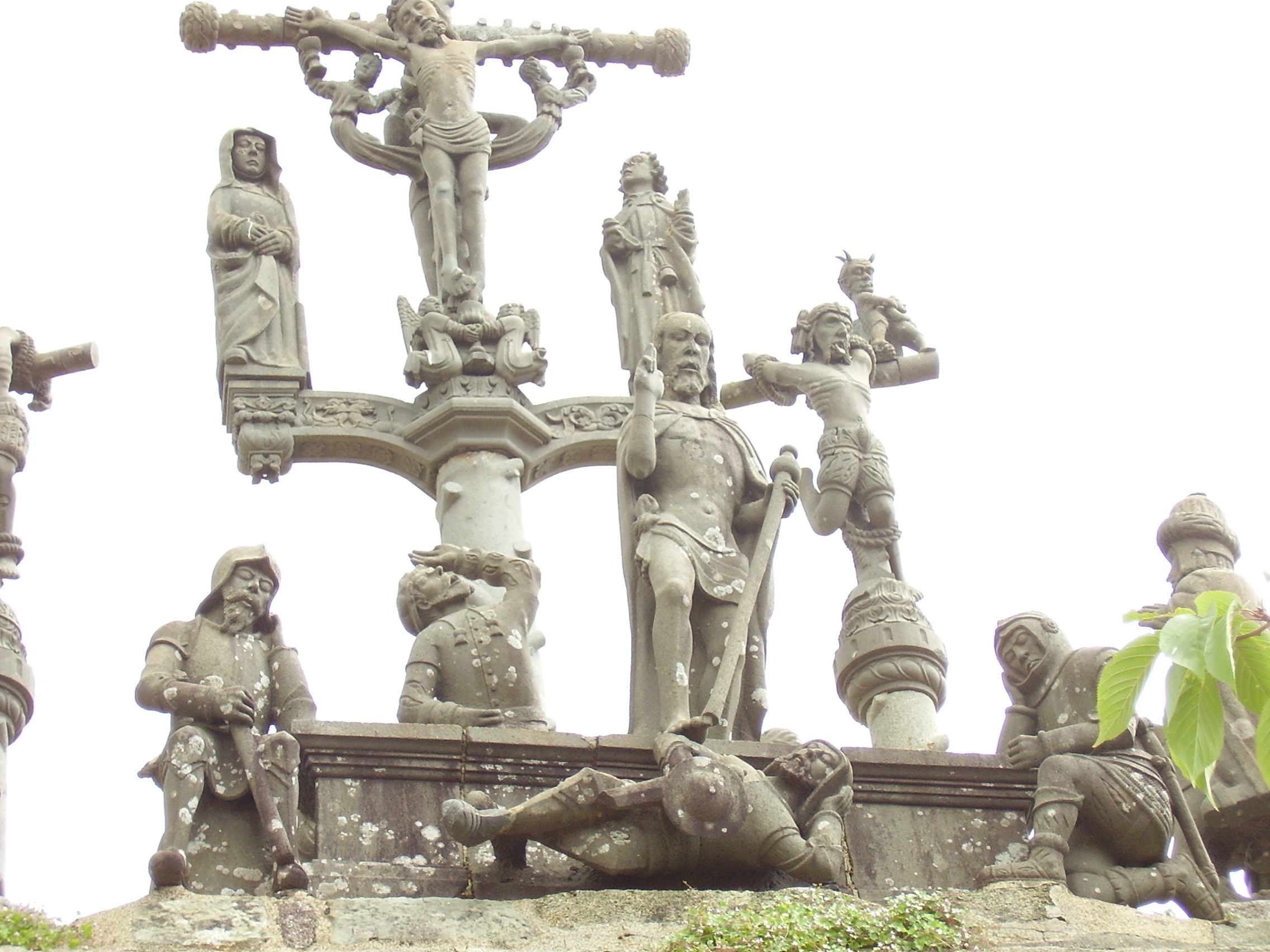
In this view of the Pleyben calvary we can see the four angels collecting the blood running from Jesus' wounds. We also see the "Risen Christ" surrounded by two sleeping guards, another shielding his eyes, overcome by the sight before him and another who lies on the ground and also seems to be sleeping. Jesus raises his right hand in a blessing and in his other hand he carries a staff. We can see the bad robber roped to his cross, his broken legs twisted below him. The devil is sat near his left shoulder ready to take his soul down to Hell.

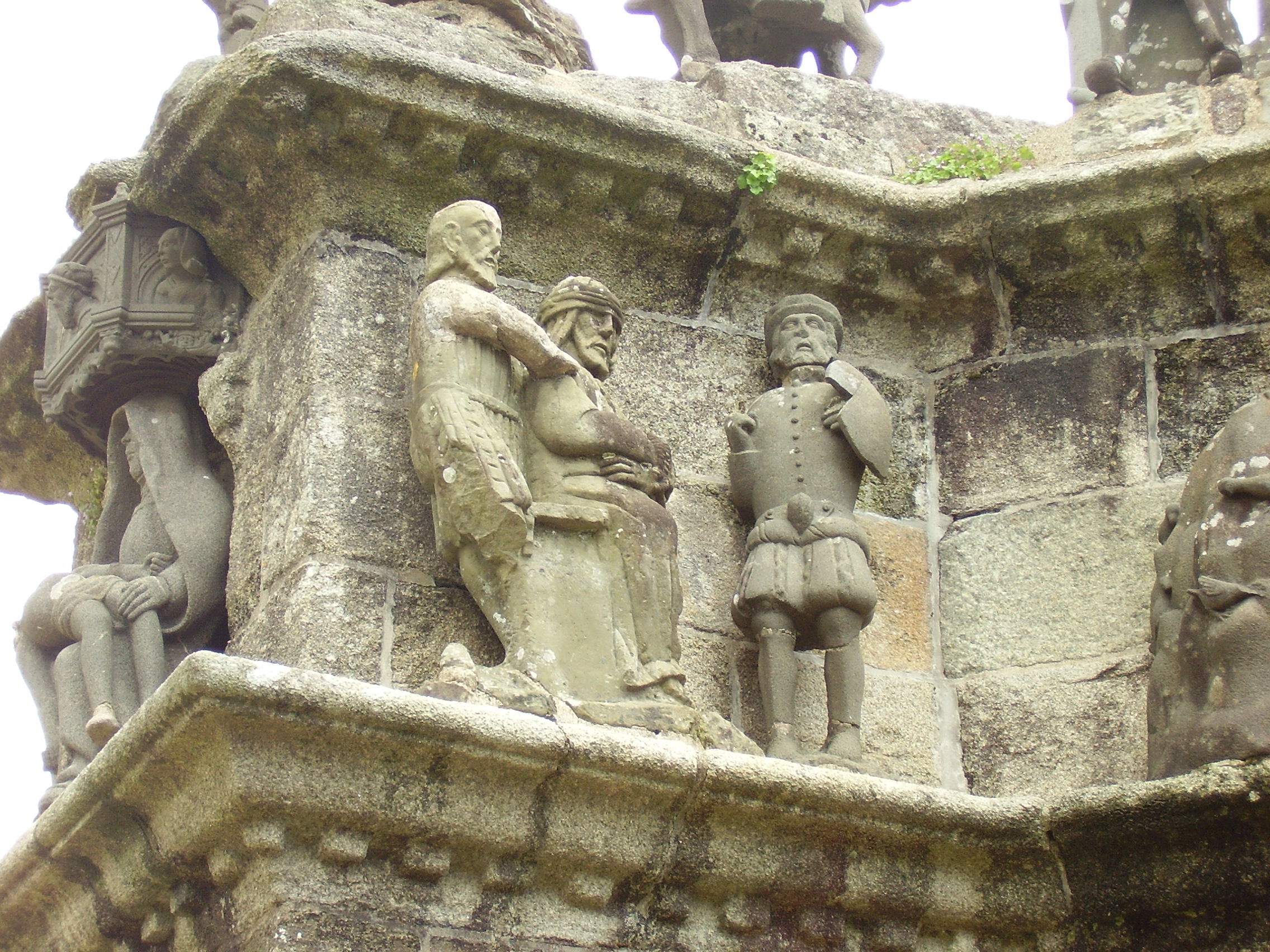
Jesus is sat on a "pretend" throne and mocked by two guards.

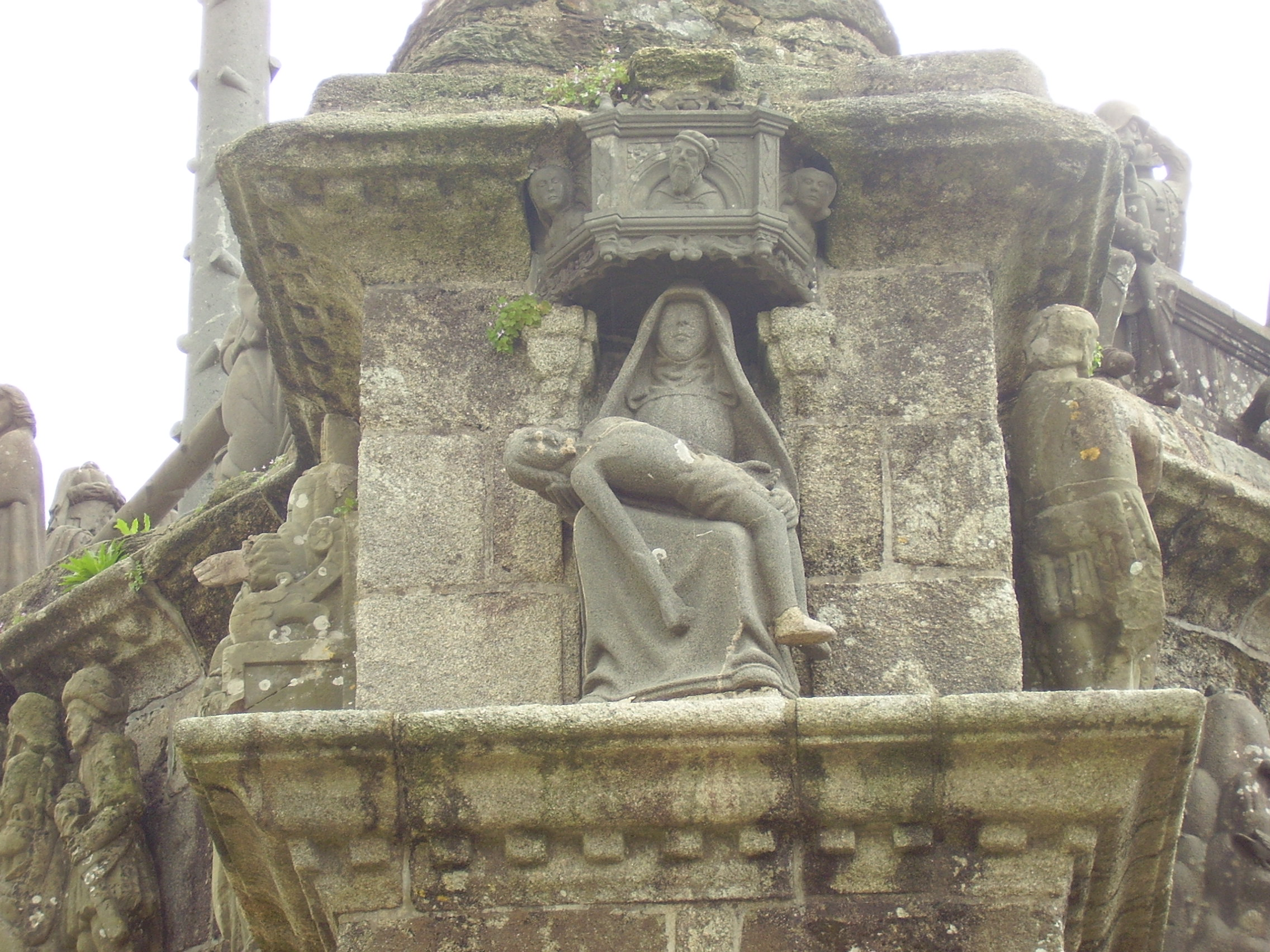
The pietà on the Pleyben calvary.

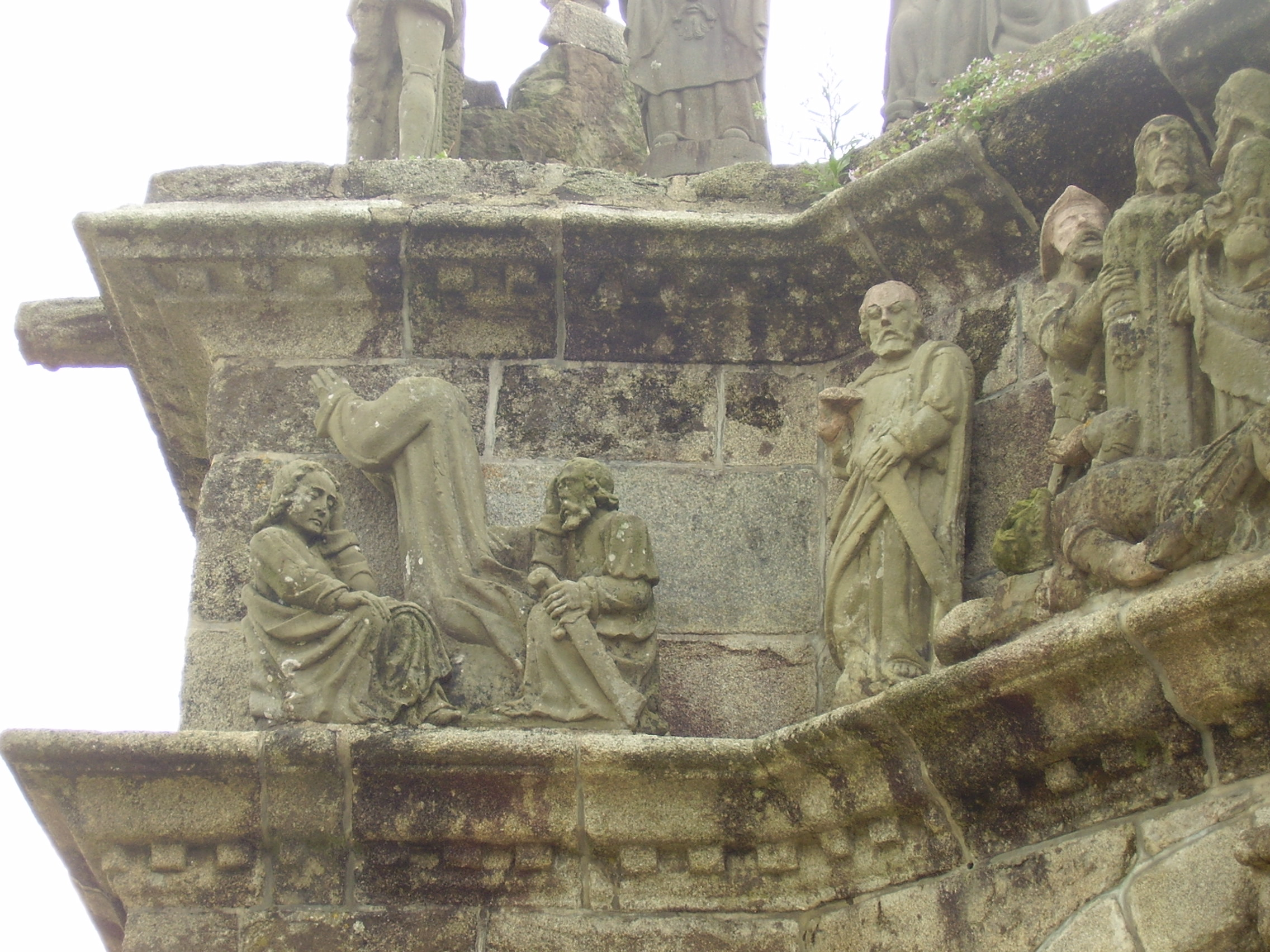
In this view of the north face of the Pleyben calvary we see Jesus praying in the Garden of Olives surrounded by two sleeping apostles. We then see St Peter with his sword looking down to his left at the scene depicting Jesus' arrest.

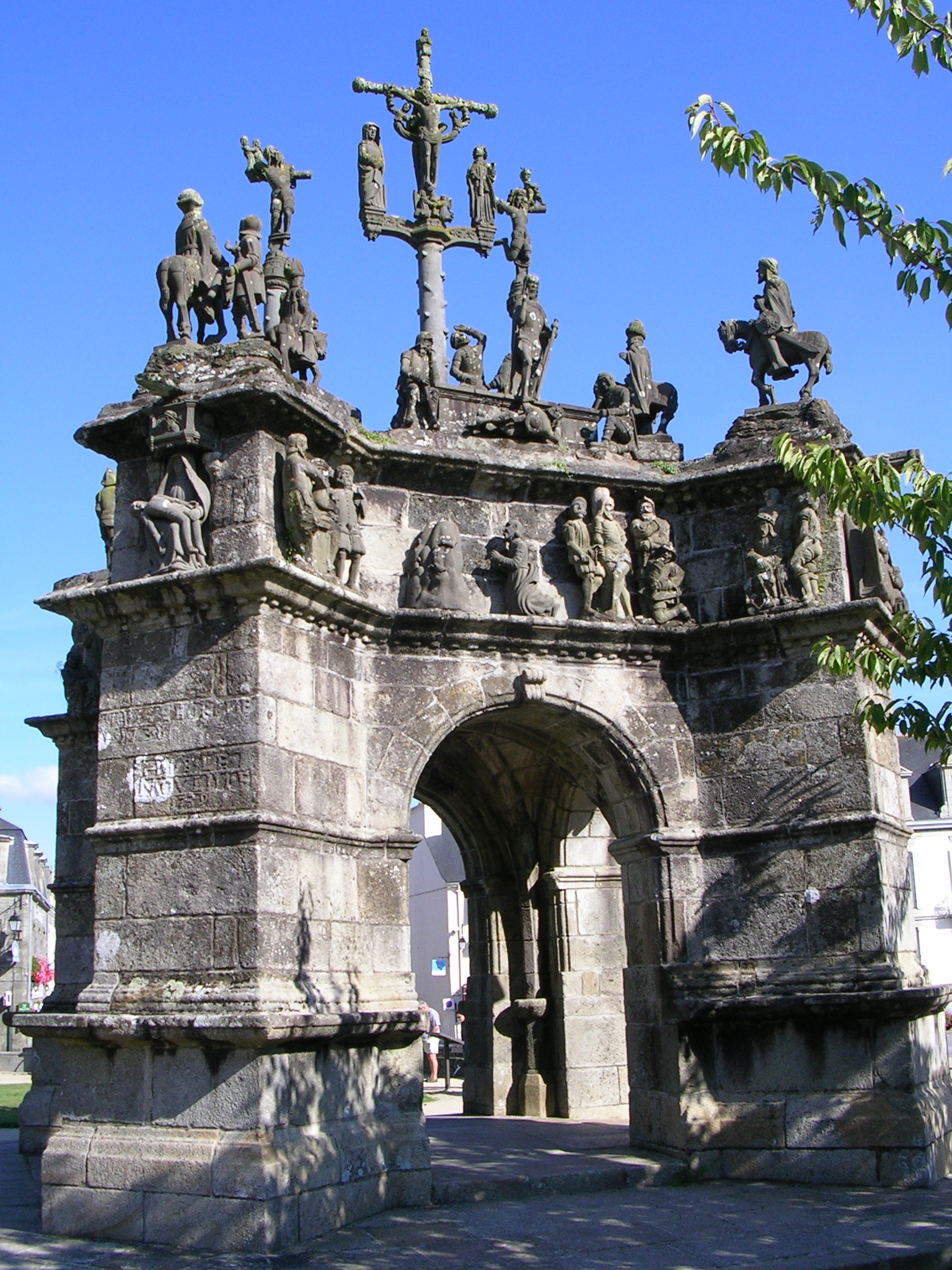
On the buttress on the left we see the pietà with the small sculpture depicting the Holy Trinity above it. On the corniche and from left to right we see Jesus being mocked and a blindfold put round his eyes, then Peter kneeling before a rock, followed by Jesus being flogged by three guards and finally the Crown of thorns being forced down on Jesus' head. On the upper platform we see Jesus emerging from his tomb in the centre and can see some of the seven statues of cavaliers spread over the calvary platform.

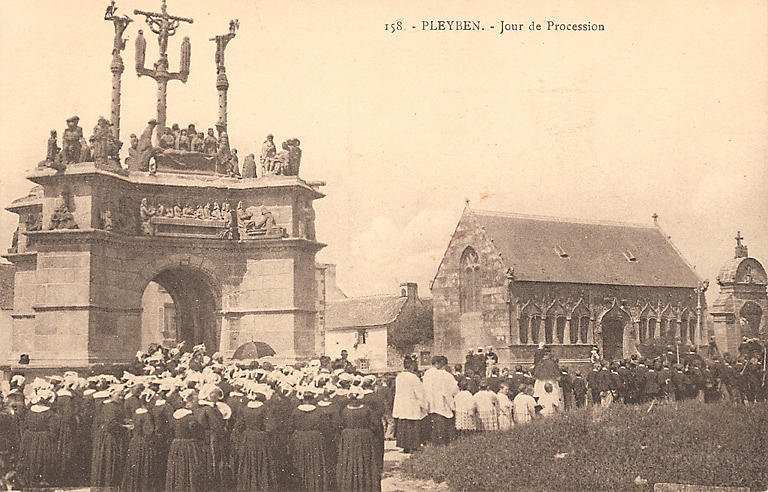
Photograph held by the Musée national des arts et traditions Populaires in Pleyben showing a procession passing by the Pleyben calvary on an unspecified date between 1903 and 1920.

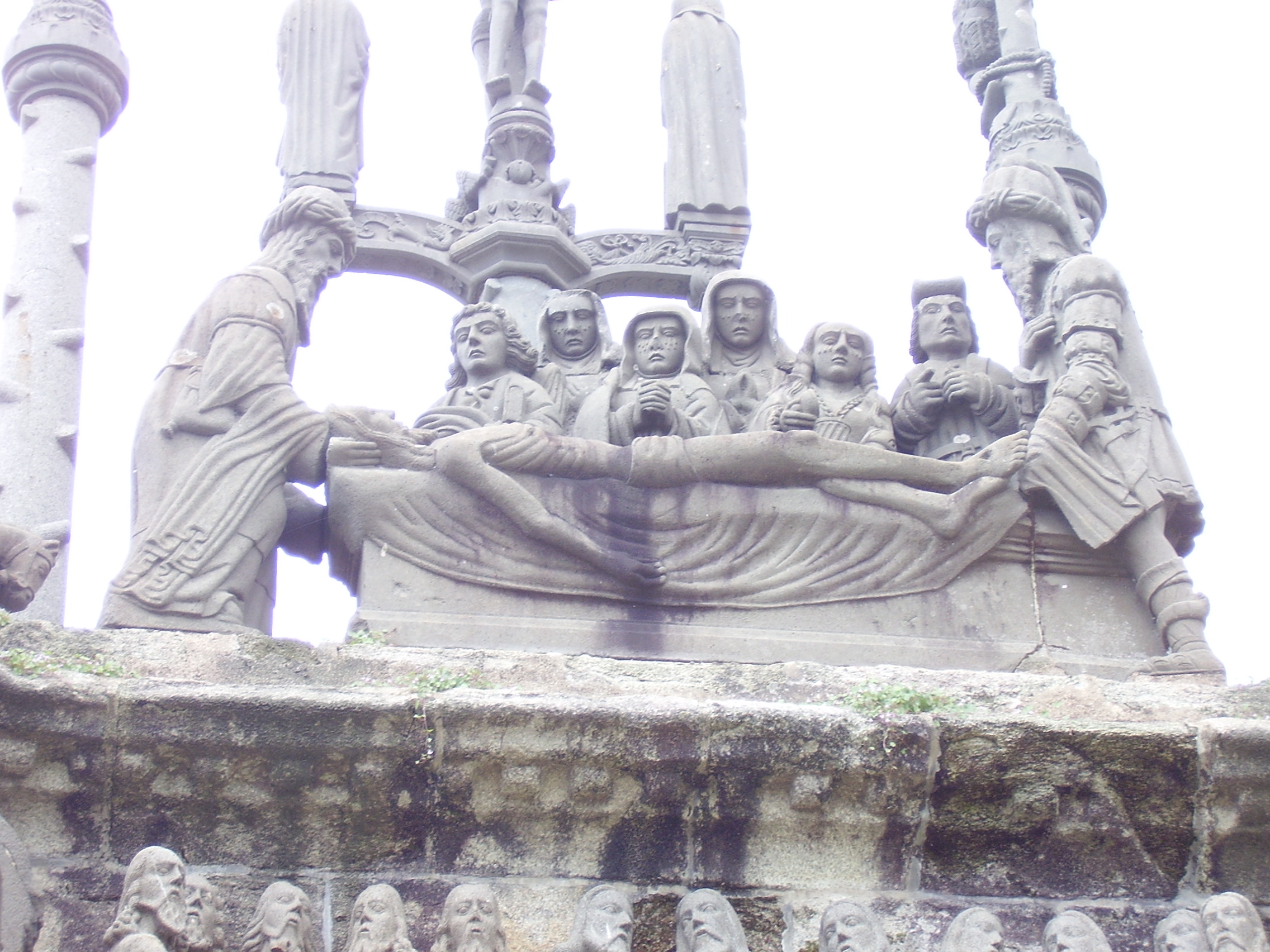
The "Mise au tombeau" on the east face of Pleyben's calvary. In a sombre scene Jesus' body is prepared for burial in the tomb.

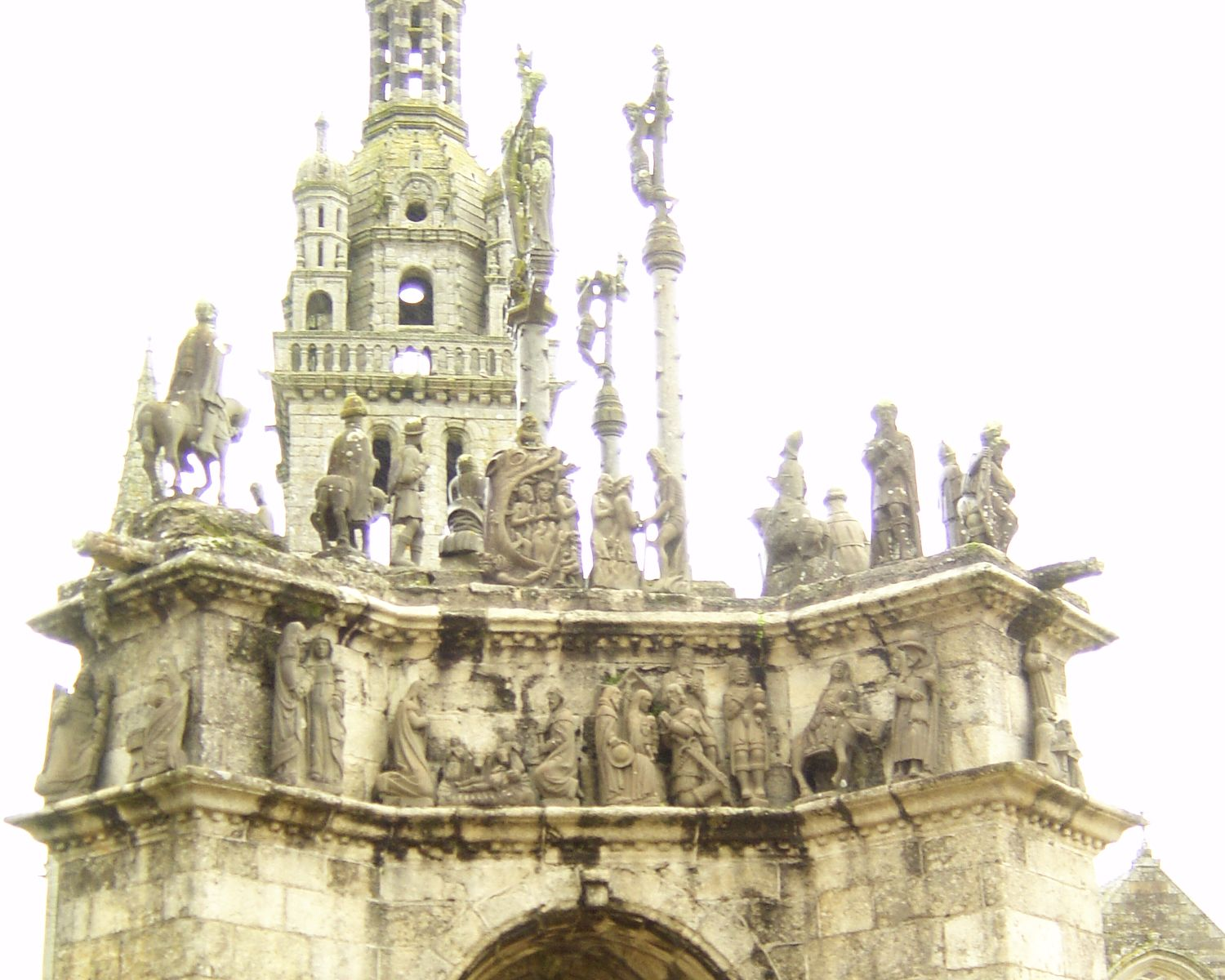
View of the south face. In the buttress to the left we see the Annunciation. On the corniche and from left to right we see the visitation, the nativity, the visit of the three wise men and the flight into Egypt. On the buttress to the right we see Jesus in discussion with two lawyers in the temple. On the left of the platform we see two horsed and one standing soldier, the descent into the mouth of Hell, another horsed soldier, a Jew carrying details of the accusation being leveled at Jesus and a soldier putting the "royal" robe on Jesus.
