= Corwith =

Corwith may refer to:

Placenames

- Corwith, Iowa, USA
- Corwith Township, Michigan, USA
- Corwith Yards in Chicago, Illinois, USA

Other

- Corwith Cramer (ship), a brigantine owned by the Sea Education Association (SEA) sailing school
