= Robert C. Seamans (ship) =

Ship launched in 2001

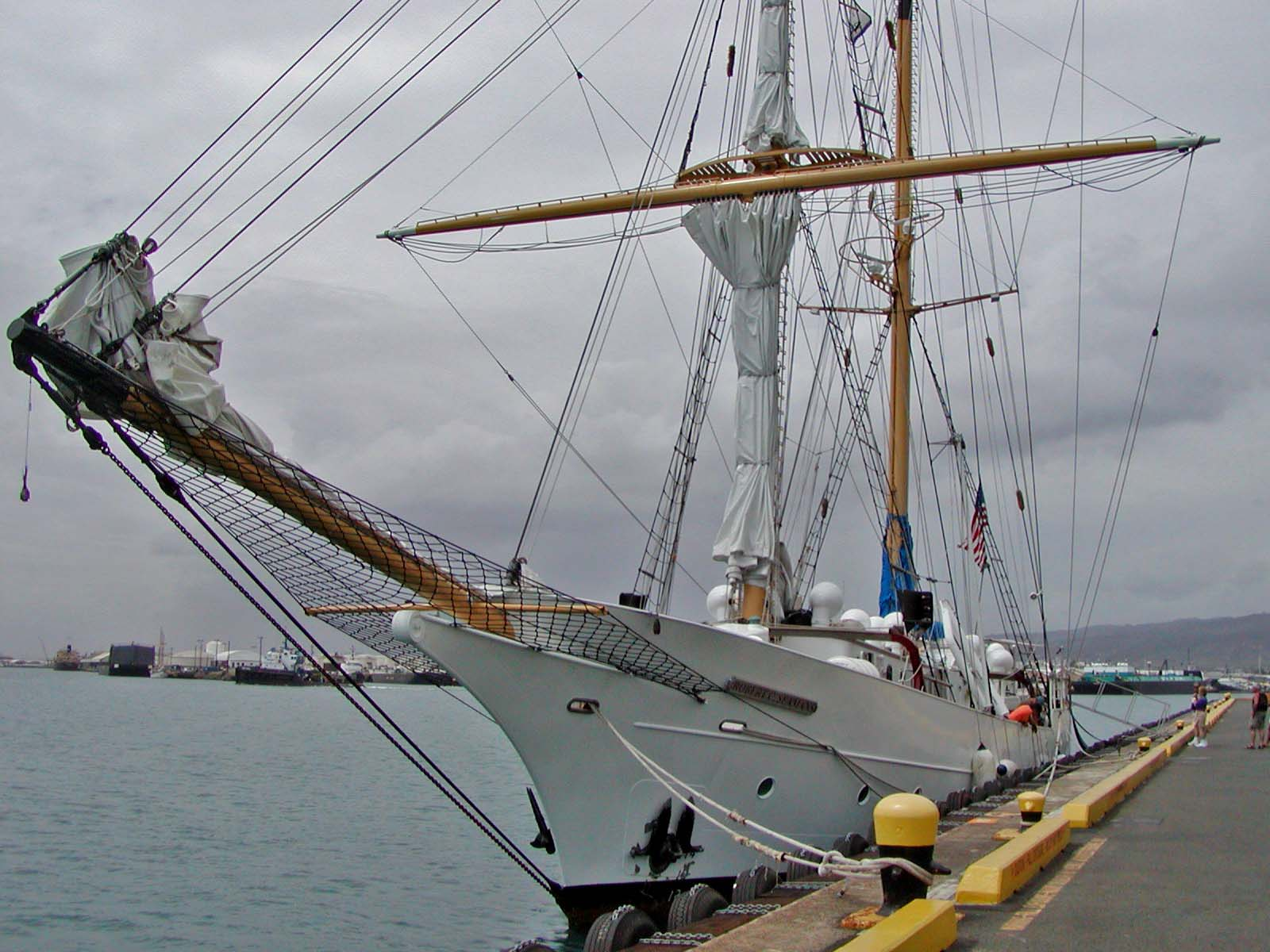
- Brigantine Robert C. Seamans in Honolulu Harbor

History

United States
- Name: Robert C. Seamans
- Namesake: Robert Seamans
- Builder: J.M. Martinac Shipbuilding Corp., Tacoma, Washington
- Launched: 2001
- Identification: IMO number: 9245483; MMSI number: 369503000; Call sign: WDA4486
- Status: active

General characteristics
- Displacement: 300 tons
- Length: 134.5 ft (41.0 m) o/a; 111.4 ft (34.0 m) on deck
- Beam: 25.4 ft (7.7 m)
- Draft: 13.8 ft (4.2 m)
- Propulsion: Sail; Auxiliary 455 hp (339 kW) Caterpillar diesel
- Sail plan: Brigantine, 8,554 sq ft (794.7 m^{2}) of sail
- Complement: 40 persons

SSV Robert C. Seamans is a 134-foot (41 m) steel sailing brigantine operated by the Sea Education Association (SEA) for oceanographic research and sail training; designed by Laurent Giles, she is named for former Secretary of the Air Force and NASA Deputy Administrator, Robert Channing Seamans, a former Chairman and Trustee of SEA's board. She is equipped with hydrographic winches, bathymetric equipment, biological and geological sampling equipment, a wet/dry laboratory, and a computer laboratory. She has a sister ship, the Corwith Cramer.

The Robert C. Seamans runs an undergraduate academic study abroad program, with intensive research in oceanography, maritime studies, and nautical science with hands-on experience aboard a traditional sailing ship.

She is based in the Pacific Ocean and typically sails between San Diego, California; Honolulu, Hawaii; Tahiti; and San Francisco, California with occasional trips to New Zealand.

She is powered by a 3408 Caterpillar (455 HP) marine diesel engine and two 40 kW Northern Lights generators that provide three-phase power.

== See also ==
- SSV Corwith Cramer
- Rigging
- Tall ship
- Woods Hole
