= Warren M. Washington =

American atmospheric scientist (1936–2024)

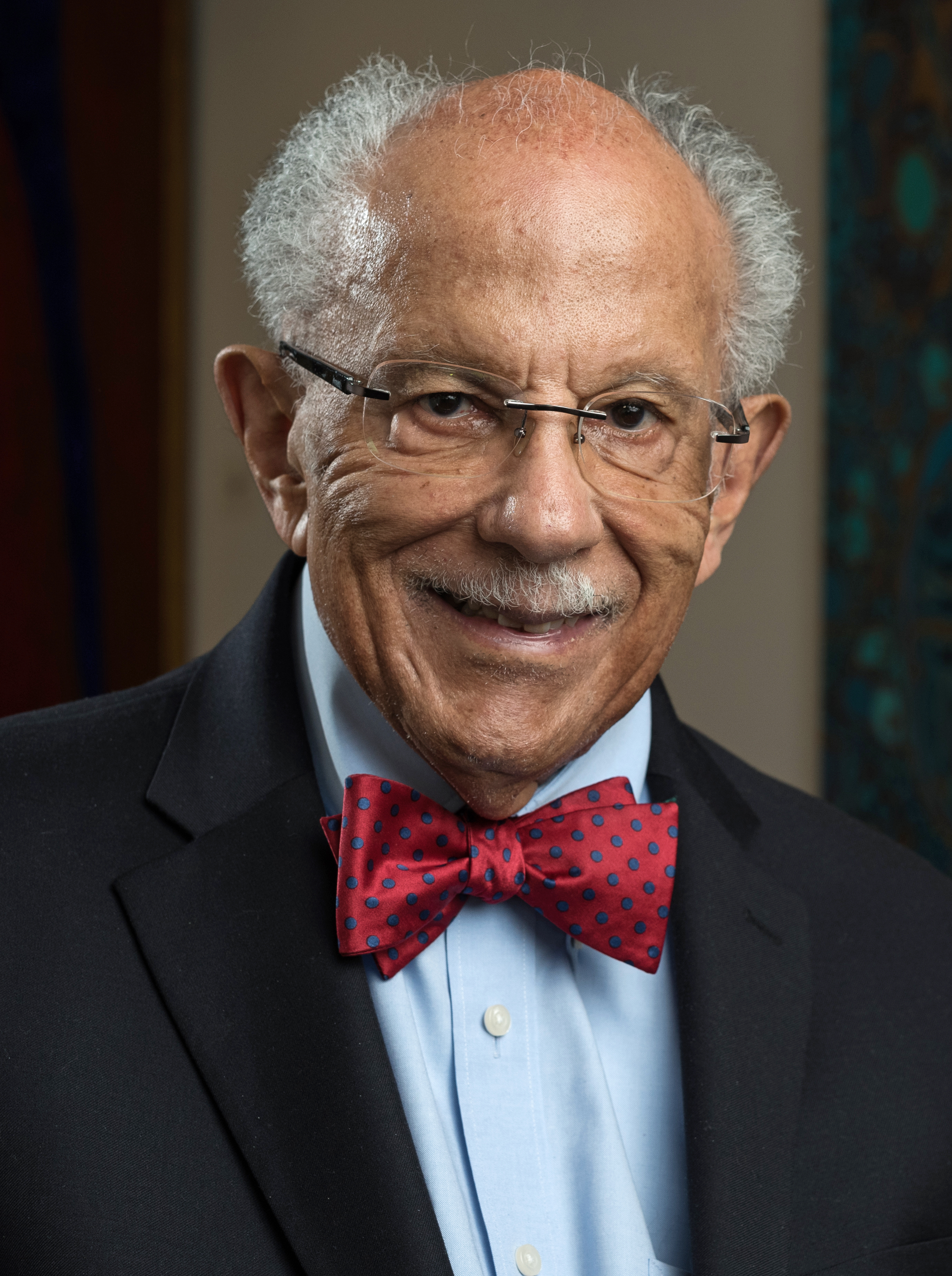
- Washington in 2018
- Born: August 28, 1936; Portland, Oregon, U.S.
- Died: October 18, 2024 (aged 88); Denver, Colorado, U.S.
- Education: Oregon State University (BS, MS); Pennsylvania State University (PhD)
- Awards: National Medal of Science; Tyler Prize for Environmental Achievement
- Scientific career
- Fields: Meteorology
- Institutions: Climate Change Research Section, Climate & Global Dynamics Division, National Center for Atmospheric Research
- Thesis: Initialization of Primitive-Equation Models for Numerical Weather Prediction (1964)
- Doctoral advisor: Hans A. Panofsky

Warren Morton Washington (August 28, 1936 – October 18, 2024) was an American atmospheric scientist, a chair of the National Science Board, and a Distinguished Scholar at the National Center for Atmospheric Research (NCAR) in Boulder, Colorado. His research was part of the United Nations Intergovernmental Panel on Climate Change that shared the 2007 Nobel Peace Prize with Al Gore. In 2019, he was awarded the Tyler Prize for Environmental Achievement.

== Early life and education ==
Washington was born in Portland, Oregon on August 28, 1936. His father worked as a Pullman porter for Union Pacific Railroad, and his mother was a nurse.

He graduated from Oregon State University (OSU) with a B. S. in physics in 1958 and an M.S. in general science in 1960.

In 1964, Washington received a doctoral degree in meteorology from Pennsylvania State University, the second African-American in the United States to earn a doctorate in meteorology. In 2019, the Warren M. Washington Building in Penn State’s Innovation Park was dedicated to honor Washington for his career and contributions to his alma mater.

== Career ==
Washington was an internationally recognized expert in atmospheric sciences and climate research specializing in computer modeling of the Earth's climate. He joined the National Center for Atmospheric Research (NCAR) in 1963 as a scientist and then moved through the ranks to become senior scientist in 1975. He was appointed to the National Science Board (NSB) in 1994, reappointed in 2000, and became chair from 2002 to 2006. In 1998 he was appointed to the National Oceanic and Atmospheric Administration (NO) Science Advisory Board; in 1999 he was elected by the Woods Hole Oceanographic Institution (WHOI) Board of Trustees as a member of the corporation for a three-year term; in 2000 he was appointed a member of the Advanced Scientific Computing Advisory Committee by the U.S. Secretary of Energy; and in February 2009 he was elected to the National Academy of Engineering (NAE) "for pioneering the development of coupled climate models, their use on parallel supercomputing architectures, and their interpretation." His scientific and policy papers are archived as the Warren M. Washington Collection at the library of the National Center for Atmospheric Research.

== Awards and honors ==
Washington received the U.S. Department of Energy's Biological and Environmental Research Program Exceptional Service Award for Atmospheric Science in 1997, for the development and application of advanced coupled atmospheric-ocean general circulation models (GCMs) to study the impacts of human activities on future climate.

In 1999 Washington received the National Weather Service (NWS) Modernization Award.

In January 2000 Washington was given the Charles Anderson Award from the American Meteorological Society (AMS) for pioneering efforts as a mentor and passionate supporter of individuals, educational programs, and outreach initiatives designed to foster a diverse population of atmospheric scientists. He also was an honorary member and past-President of the AMS.

In March 2000 Washington received the Celebrating 20th Century Pioneers in Atmospheric Sciences Award at Howard University and in April 2000 Colorado's Bonfils-Stanton Foundation Award in recognition of significant and unique contributions in the field of science.

In 2007, Washington's research was included in the United Nations Intergovernmental Panel on Climate Change, a U.N. study and advisory panel that shared the 2007 Nobel Peace Prize with Al Gore, the former Vice President of the United States.

In 2009 he was elected as a fellow of the American Academy of Arts and Sciences (AAAS).

In 2010, President Barack Obama awarded Washington a National Medal of Science for 2009.

In 2019, Washington and Michael E. Mann were awarded the Tyler Prize for Environmental Achievement, recognized as the top honor in environment-related work.

Washington gave the 2019 Ambrose Jearld Jr. lectureship sponsored by the Woods Hole Diversity Initiative.

He was a fellow of the American Philosophical Society (APS), and he received honorary doctorates from Oregon State University and Bates College.

== Personal life ==
Washington's first marriage to LaRae Herring produced three children: Teri Ciocco, Kim Washington Pierce, and Tracy Cannon-Smith, MD, a urological surgeon. His marriage to Herring ended in divorce. In 1979, he married Joan Ann Hunt, who died in 1987. In 1993, he married Mary (née Curtis) Washington.

He had ten grandchildren, including professional soccer player Reggie Cannon.

== Death and legacy ==
Washington died at his home in Denver, Colorado, on October 18, 2024, at the age of 88.

== Publications ==
- Washington, Warren M; Washington, Mary C (2008). "Odyssey in Climate Modelling, Global Warming, and Advising Five Presidents".
- Washington, Warren M; Parkinson, Claire L. (2005). "An Introduction to Three-dimensional Climate Modelling".
- Hu, Aixue; Xu, Yangyang; Tebaldi, Claudia et al. (2013). "Mitigation of short-lived climate pollutants slow sea-level rise". doi:10.1038/nclimate1869
