= Ambrose Jearld Jr. =

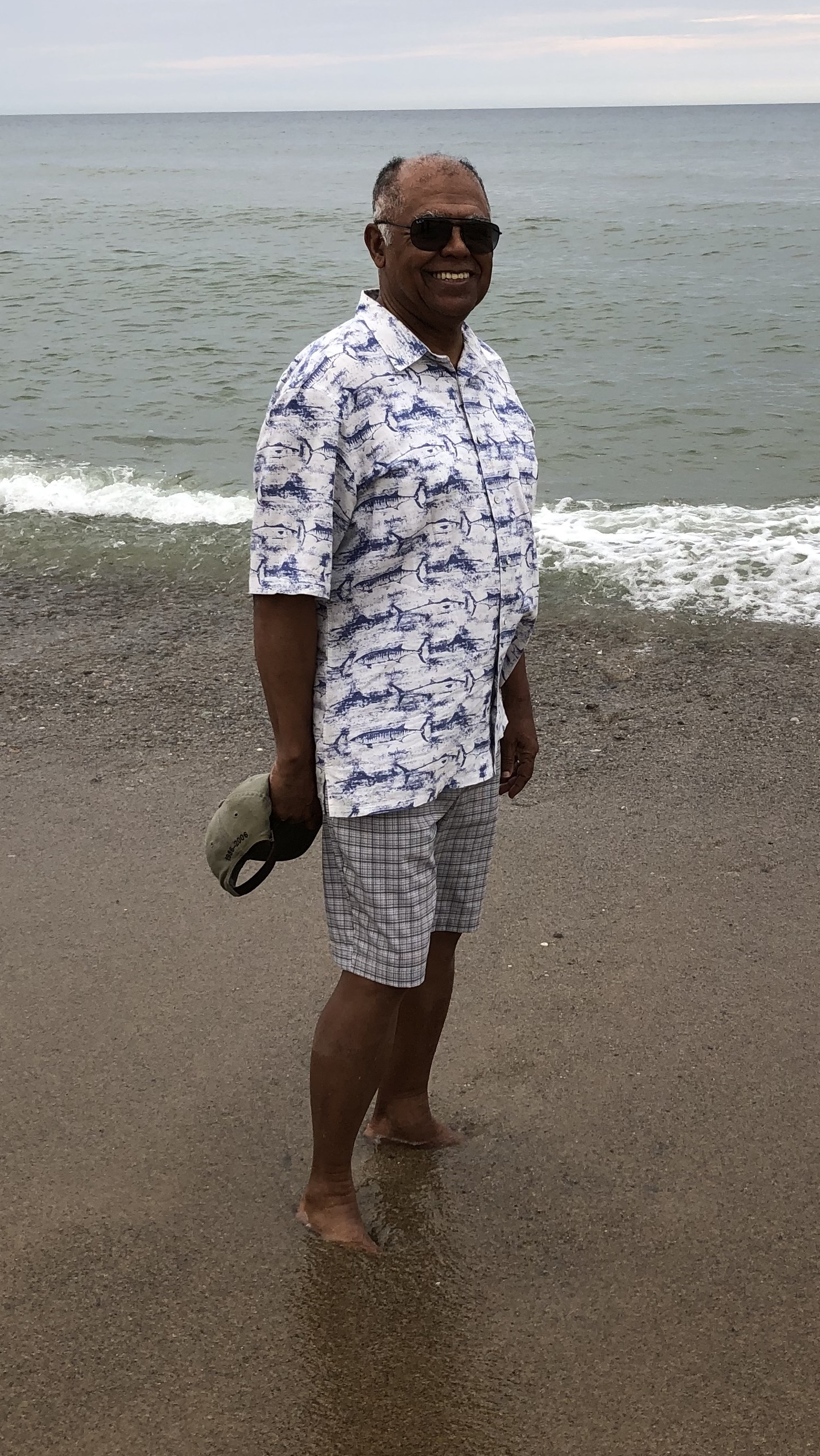
- Born: Orrum, North Carolina
- Education: University of Maryland Eastern Shore (B.S., 1965); Oklahoma State (M.S., 1970; Ph.D., 1975)
- Awards: Fellow of American Fisheries Society; Annual Ambrose Jearld Jr. lectureship at Woods Hole Diversity Initiative
- Scientific career
- Fields: Marine Biology
- Thesis: Ethological Study of the Honey Gourami, Colisa Chuna, and Its Congeners (1975)
- Academic advisors: Rudy Miller

Ambrose Jearld Jr. is a marine biologist who started his career as one of the first black fisheries biologists at the National Oceanic and Atmospheric Administration (NOAA). He spent his nearly 40-year career at the Northeast Fisheries Science Center (NEFSC) in Woods Hole, Massachusetts. The lecture series named after him in Woods Hole reflects his career-long commitment to increasing diversity in environmental and fisheries sciences.

== Early life and education ==
Ambrose Jearld Jr. grew up on a family farm in Orrum, North Carolina and became interested in science during high school.

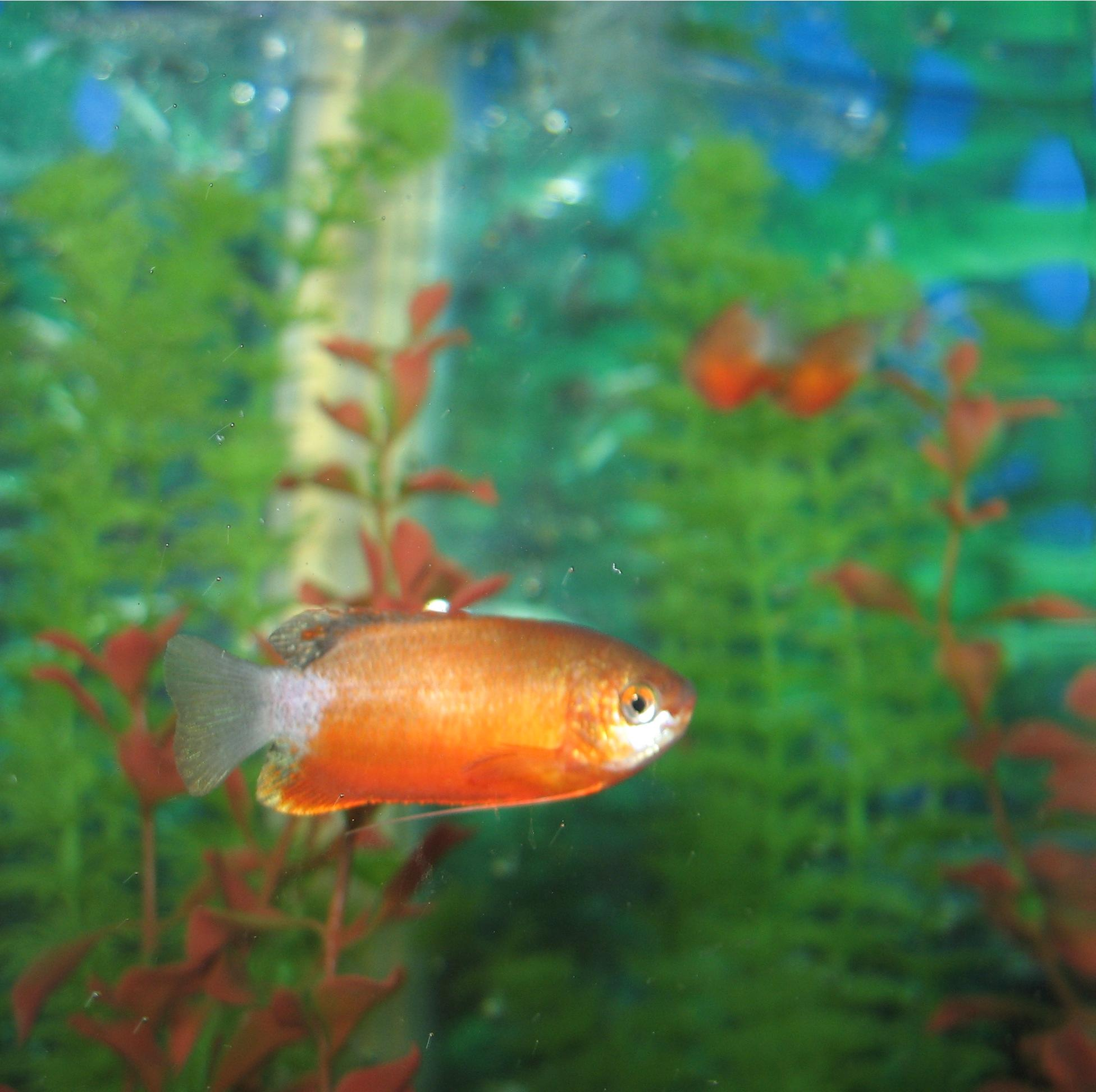
Honey Gourami studied by Ambrose Jearld Jr. for his dissertation at Oklahoma State University–Stillwater

In 1965, Jearld earned a BS from what is now called the University of Maryland Eastern Shore, with a major in Biology and a minor in Chemistry. After graduating, he worked for a few years as a chemist at Publicker Industries Inc. in Philadelphia. In 1967, he was recruited by Bradford Brown to begin a fully-funded Masters program at Oklahoma State University–Stillwater. In 1969, he was drafted into the army during the Vietnam war and was posted in Maryland at a Medical Research Laboratory where he was able to conduct biological research. During this time in the military, Jearld also worked on his MS research on Channel catfish, earning his degree in 1970 from Oklahoma State University–Stillwater. After completing his military service in 1971, Jearld had several offers to attend doctoral programs but chose to return to Oklahoma State University–Stillwater for a PhD, working with his advisor, Rudy Miller. His zoology dissertation research on the sexual behavior of the Honey gourami earned him his PhD in 1975.

== Career and research ==
After earning his PhD Jearld worked as an assistant professor of biology at Lincoln University (Pennsylvania) from 1975 until 1977 when he took an assistant professor position at Howard University. During this time, he took advantage of short-term research opportunities at different locations across the country, including studies of anchovy in San Francisco Bay in collaboration with Lawrence Livermore Laboratory and the University of California.

Jearld spent the summer of 1977 doing research with marine animals at the center's Sandy Hook Laboratory in New Jersey, and the summer of 1978 on a part-time appointment at the Woods Hole Laboratory. That summer, a permanent federal research position in Falmouth, Massachusetts was announced, which Jearld applied for, and was hired. Jearld worked at the National Oceanic and Atmospheric Administration (NOAA) Northeast Fisheries Science Center (NEFSC) from 1978 until his retirement in 2016.

At the time of his hiring, Jearld was the first black researcher with a doctorate degree at NEFSC. He joined a group that was tasked with acquiring biological information to assess the populations and stocks of important fishery resources. The group collected data on a wide range of metrics including age, which has resulted a robust and well-known data set of age composition for many fish and shellfish species. Jearld contributed to several studies on techniques for age determination including optical Fourier transform analysis of fish scales and definition of growth lines from microstructure of ocean quahog shells. He also authored the chapter on Age Determination in Fishery Techniques, an oft cited reference for fisheries scientists.

In 1985, Jearld became chief of the Research Planning and Evaluation Section, and in 1997 became chief of the Research Planning and Coordination. in 2004, he became the Director of Academic Programs, the position he eventually retired from in 2016.

In his role as a biologist and administrator, Jearld has advised the NOAA on national and international affairs in South Africa. He was appointed to the US - South African Bi-Lateral Commission's Working Group on Fisheries and he worked with Sea Fisheries, South Africa, on development and implementation of a series of reforms including restructuring and outreach. He has been involved in NOAA science and technical support for six West African countries around the Gulf of Guinea.

=== Diversity initiatives ===
Jearld was the first chair of the Woods Hole Diversity Advisory Committee, a six-institution collaboration started in 2004 to promote diversity and inclusion across the NOAA Northeast Fisheries Science Center, Marine Biological Laboratory, Sea Education Association, United States Geological Survey, Woods Hole Oceanographic Institution, and Woods Hole Research Center. Ambrose Jearld Jr. was the co-founder of the Partnership Education Program (PEP) and served as its Director from its inception in 2009 until 2016, when he retired. PEP recruits mainly junior and senior undergraduate students from underrepresented groups interested in marine and environmental sciences. In 2017, the Woods Hole scientific community launched an annual lectureship named in his honor.

== Honors and recognition ==
- 2021 American Geophysical Union Ambassador Awardee
- Inaugural class of American Fisheries Society Fellows in 2015
- Leadership Council of the American Geophysical Union
- 2004 Member of the Sea Education Association Board of Trustees
- 2007 Member of the Massachusetts Maritime Academy Board of Trustees
- 2017 The Woods Hole Diversity Initiative launched the annual Ambrose Jearld Jr. lectureship recognizing Jearld's work on improving diversity and inclusion within the ocean sciences community. Speakers have included David J. Asai (2017), Ashanti Johnson (2018), Warren M. Washington (2019) and Nigel Golden (2020).
