= Sea Education Association =

US non-profit organization

Coordinates: 41.549°N 70.645°W

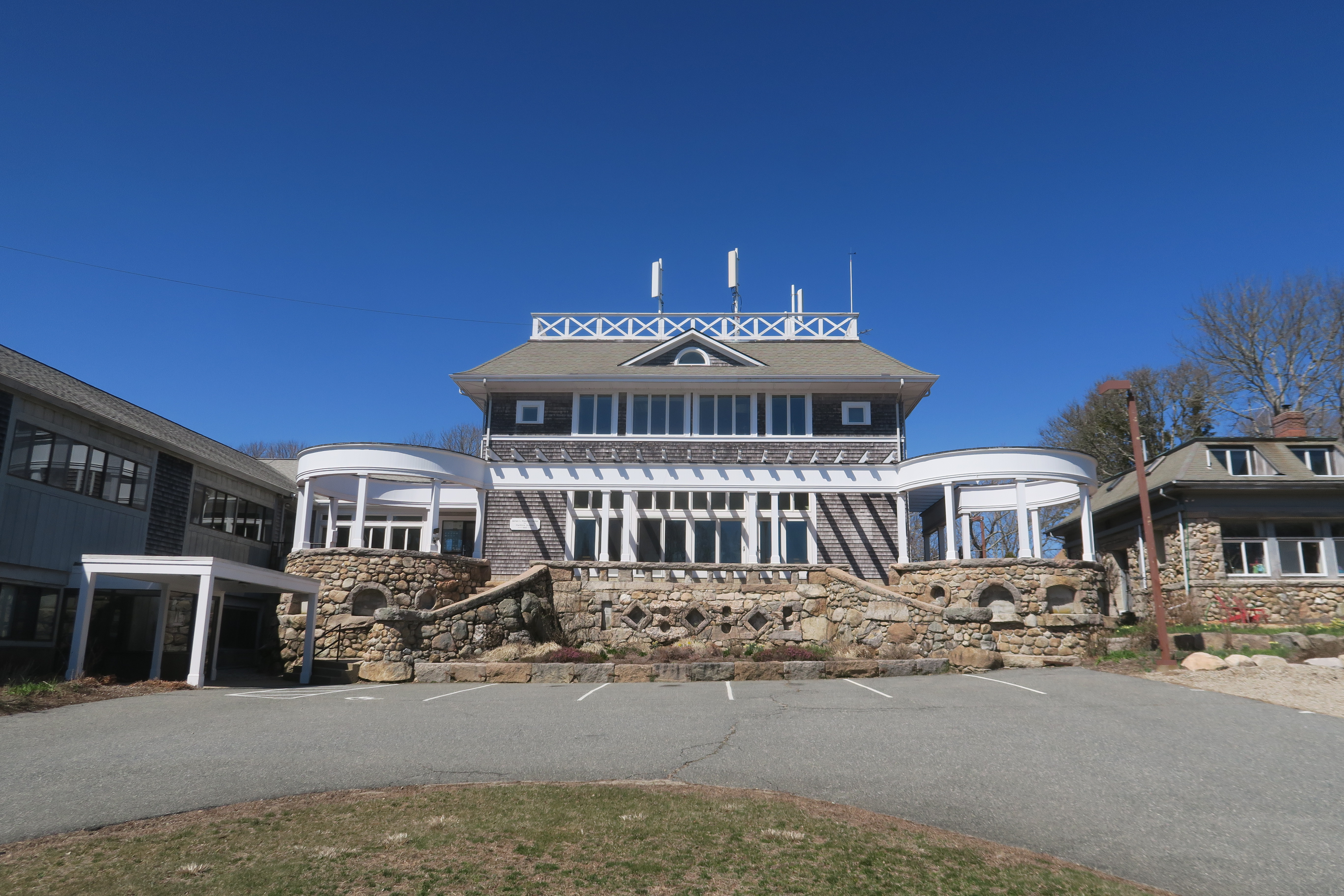
James L. Madden Center for Maritime Studies

Sea Education Association (SEA) is a private, nonprofit educational organization. Founded in 1971 by Corwith Cramer, Jr. SEA operates two sailing ships traveling throughout both the Atlantic and Pacific Oceans.

SEA is based on Cape Cod in the oceanographic research community of Woods Hole, Massachusetts.

== History ==
Founded in 1971, the Sea Education Association spent its first years operated from headquarters in Boston and Chicago, however in 1975, Corwith Cramer had the organization and its sole vessel, the R/V Westward, transferred to its modern-day location in Woods Hole, Massachusetts.

Over the years, the program would expand greatly, with more ocean semester programs being offered at a time and the expanding of the SEA fleet. Most of these changes can be accredited to Cramer's successor, Rafe Parker, who replaced him in 1982. Some of the program's most significant changes include, the addition of the SSV Corwith Cramer brigantine in 1987, and the replacement of the R/V Westward with the SSV Robert C. Seamans in 2001.

John Bullard took over as President in 2002 and retired in June 2012. During Bullard's term, SEA developed the Stanford@SEA Program and formed additional partnerships with domestic and foreign universities.

In 2004 SEA joined the Woods Hole Diversity Advisory Committee, a coordination between NOAA Northeast Fisheries Science Center, Marine Biological Laboratory, United States Geological Survey, Woods Hole Oceanographic Institution, and Woods Hole Research Center to increase diversity and inclusion within ocean sciences. This effort was initiated and led by Ambrose Jearld Jr. of Woods Hole.

Peg Brandon, SEA Semester alumna and former SEA Faculty Captain, took over as SEA's President in 2014. Her departure was announced in March of 2022. The interim president, Dr. John Wigglesworth, was also an alumnus of the program. In 2024 Dr. Richard Hopper took over as president.

== Vessels ==
- SSV Corwith Cramer
- SSV Robert C. Seamans
