= John Laurent Giles =

Naval architect (1901–1969)

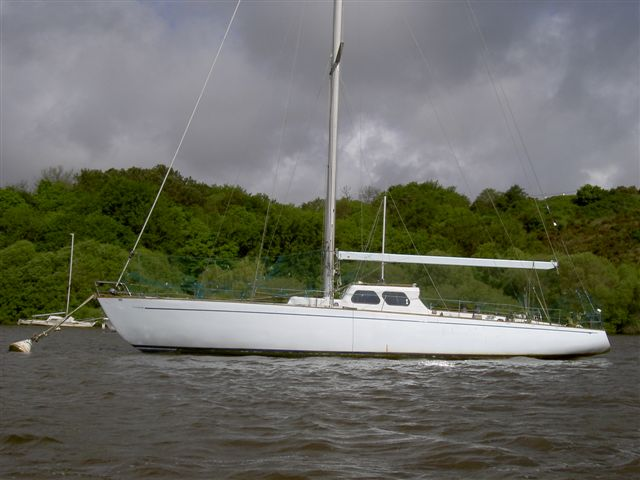
Gulvain

John Laurent Giles (1901–1969) was an English naval architect who was particularly famous for his sailing yachts. He and his company, Laurent Giles & Partners Ltd, have designed more than 1400 boats from cruisers and racing yachts to megayachts.

== Examples ==
Notable examples of Laurent Giles' work include the famous 25-foot (7.6 m) Vertue (sail numbers suggest that some 230 of these have been made), Wanderer III, the 30' sloop in which Eric and Susan Hiscock circumnavigated, and the race-winning Gulvain, the first ocean racing yacht to be made from an aluminium alloy.

His famous Myth of Malham, a revolutionary small displacement yacht for John Illingworth, was inspired by developments in aeronautics; the novel design helped win the Fastnet race in 1947 and 1949. The updated Miranda IV of 1951 had a rudder mounted separately from the aft of the keel (a 'spade rudder') which heralded the arrival of the modern period of yacht design.

Laurent Giles described as part of his design philosophy that a yacht should have "the utmost docility and sureness of manoeuvring at sea, in good or bad weather" - his boats were designed to maintain a steady course with minimal action by the helmsman but respond instantly to the helm if the need arose.

He was awarded the honour of Royal Designer for Industry in 1951.

== Select List of Designs by Laurent Giles ==
- First Yacht Lutine (C&N 60')
- Gulvain
- Jolly Boat (Laurent Giles)
- Vive Sailboat 33', 1950 (Woodnutts-Laurent Giles)
- Lymington-L-Class (1933) and the later modified/ revised L-Class design of 1955
- Maid of Malin
- Peter Duck (yacht)
- R.N.S.A. 24 (32'), 1947
- Robert C. Seamans (ship)
- Sails Of Dawn, Mc Gruer 57', 1969, the final yacht before Giles' death
- Seamaster Sailer 19
- Seamaster Sailer 23
- Vertue (yacht)
- Vertue II- a beamier version of the original Vertue design, mostly made in GRP
- Wanderer Class, 29’9”, 9 tons
- Westerly Yachts (Westerly Marine Construction Ltd) - a number of designs, (Note: further designs for Westerly Yachts include: BERWICK 31; CONWAY 36; Galway 36; GK 29; JOUSTER 21; KENDAL 23; MEDWAY 36; PEMBROKE 26; PENTLAND 32; RENOWN 32; SOLWAY 36; VULCAN 34; WARWICK 21; WESTERLY 21) including their Centaur 26, Pageant 24, Chieftain 26, GK24, Longbow 31, Westerly 33, Discus 33 and Konsort 29.

== See also ==
- Category:Sailing yachts designed by Laurent Giles
- Category:Boats designed by Laurent Giles
