= Jolly Boat (Laurent Giles) =

Sailboat design

Specifications

Number of crew	2-5
LOA	6100 mm (20 ft)
LOD	4600 mm (15 ft)
Beam	2000 mm (6 ft 6 in)
Draft	380 mm (15 in)
Displacement(without ballast)	380 kg
Sail area of total ketch rig	13.94 m² (150 ft²)

The Jolly Boat is a 15 foot (4.6 metre) ketch rigged open day-boat designed by J. Laurent Giles. Originally designed for plywood construction, more recent examples were made with GRP with plywood decks and bulkheads, manufactured by AJS Marine Services in Chichester. The standard specification was described as a yawl rig, however the mizzen mast is mounted forward of the rudder making the rig a ketch (in modern terminology, see yawl: historical usage) although this is unusual for so small a boat. The foresail is mounted on a bowsprit. A sloop rig version was also available. In the ketch configuration the mainsail is gaff rigged and the mizzen a balanced lug. A steel centre plate and ballast makes the boat quite stable, and the high topsides, broad beam and large cockpit are designed with comfortable family cruising in mind. An outboard well on the port side is provided for a 4h.p. outboard motor.
