= Gulvain =

Ocean-racing sloop

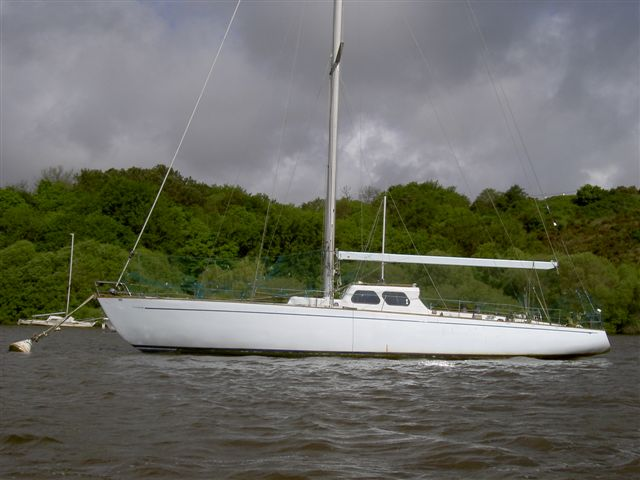
Gulvain

Gulvain is a 55-foot (17 m) ocean-racing sloop named after the mountain Gaor Bheinn (or "Gulvain"). Designed by Jack Laurent Giles for Jack Rawlings, she was based on the earlier boats Maid of Malham and Myth of Malham. She was built in Shoreham by Sussex Shipbuilding Company, owned by Rawlings, and launched on 27 June 1949. She was made from Birmabright, making her the first ocean racing yacht to be made from an aluminium alloy. Aluminium was used for strength, not weight: she displaces 16.5 long tons (16,800 kg) and weighs 23 long tons (23,000 kg), including ballast. She was one of the first boats to have a metal mast. Her hull has a reverse sheer, and she has a Masthead rig.

She proved to be a very successful boat, winning her maiden race from Cowes to Dinard and back. She was forced to retire from the 1949 Fastnet Race, but performed well in the Newport Bermuda Race in 1950, and was first home in the first postwar transatlantic race from Bermuda to Plymouth immediately afterwards. She was skipped for both races by Humphrey Barton, and amongst the crew was Tim Heywood. She was bought by John Tassos in 1965, and by Robert Schyberg in 1988. She was renovated in 1991 and took part in her second Fastnet Race in 1991.
