= Corwith Cramer (ship) =

Tall ship

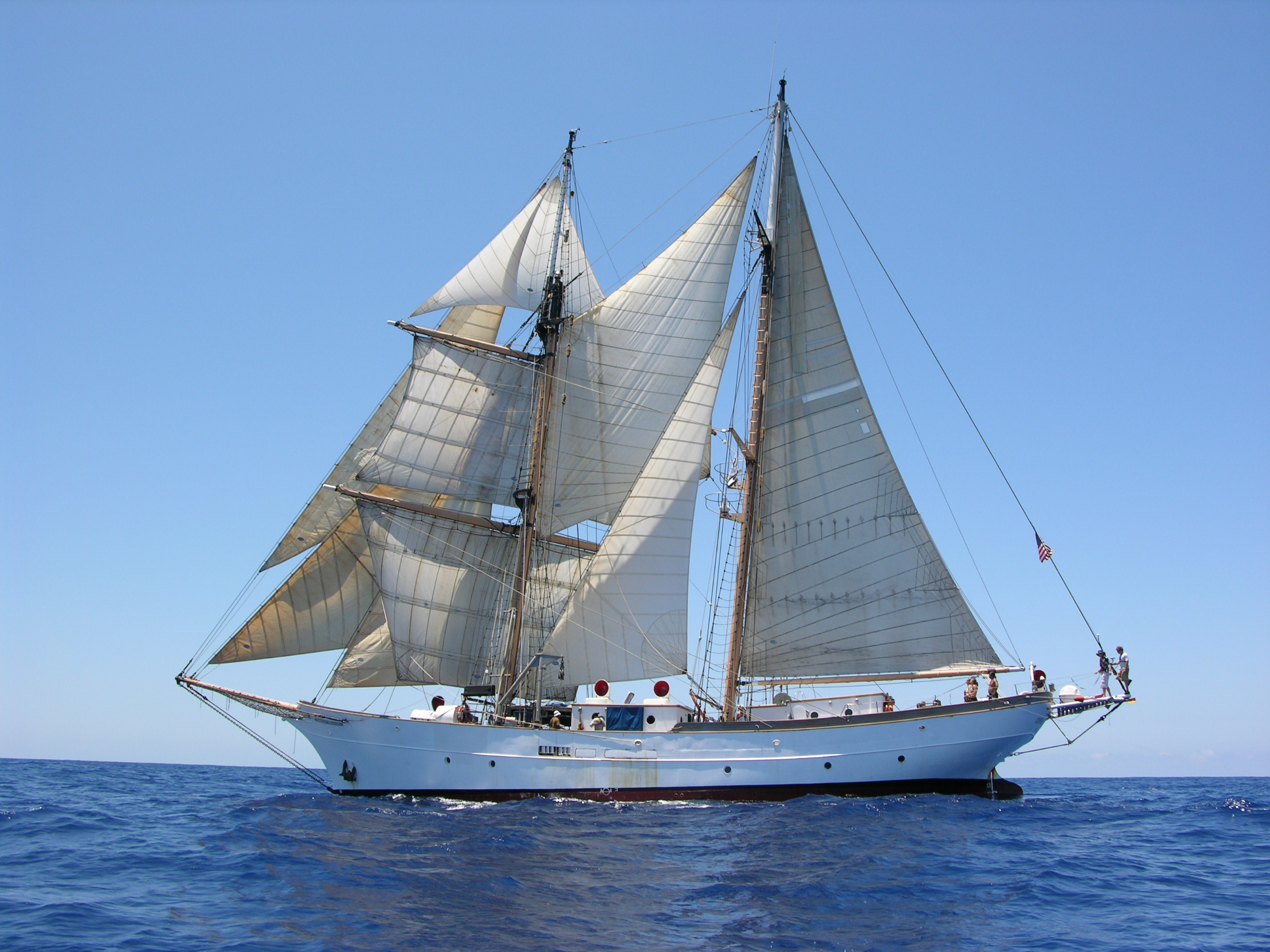
- Brigantine Corwith Cramer under full sail in the Caribbean Sea

History

United States
- Name: Corwith Cramer
- Builder: ASTACE Shipyard, Bilbao, Spain
- Launched: 1987
- Identification: IMO number: 8617445; MMSI number: 366724450; Callsign: WTF3319
- Status: active

General characteristics
- Displacement: 280 tons
- Length: 134 ft (41 m) overall, 98 ft (30 m) on deck
- Beam: 26 ft (7.9 m)
- Draft: 13 ft (4.0 m)
- Propulsion: Sail; auxiliary 500 hp (370 kW) Cummins diesel
- Sail plan: Brigantine, 7,800 sq ft (720 m^{2}) of sail
- Complement: 38 persons

The Corwith Cramer is a tall ship (specifically a brigantine) owned by the Sea Education Association (SEA) sailing school, named after SEA's founding director. Her home port is Woods Hole, Massachusetts, United States. She was designed by Wooden and Marean specifically for SEA and was constructed by ASTACE in 1987 in Bilbao, Spain. She is a 134-foot (41 m) steel brigantine built as a research vessel for operation under sail, and generally sails in the Atlantic Ocean. A young David Brainard spent six weeks aboard the Corwith Cramer for his “Sea Semester”.

== See also ==
- SSV Robert C. Seamans
- Brigantine
- Woods Hole
- Nautical terms
- Rigging
- Tall ship
