= List of sailing ships participating in Sail Amsterdam 2015 =

This is a list of sailing ships participating in Sail Amsterdam 2015.

List of sailing ships participating in Sail Amsterdam 2015
Name	Type	Location	Year of completion	Length (m)		Beam (m)	Draft (m)	Sail area (m^{2})	Image
Name	Type	Location	Year of completion	total	hull	Beam (m)	Draft (m)	Sail area (m^{2})	Image
Abel Tasman; IMO 5202794; Netherlands	Schooner	Currently	1913	40,5		6,60	2,50	350	more
Admiraal van Kinsbergen; ENI 02302173; Netherlands	Barquentine	Currently	1892	67,00		6,60	2,10	600	
Alexander von Humboldt II IMO 9618446; Germany	Barque	Currently	2011	64,73	57	10	5	1360	more
Ambiance; ENI 02303678; Netherlands	Clipper	Currently	1908	39,8	38,95	6,02	1,25	350	
ARC Gloria; IMO 8642555; Colombia	Barque	Currently	1968	76,00	64,60	10,60	5,00	1250	more
Artemis; IMO 5209699; Netherlands	Barque	Currently	1926	59,00	42,00	7,01	3,10	1050	more
Atlantis; IMO 8333635; Netherlands	Barquentine	Currently	1905	57,00		7,45	5,00	742	more
Atyla; Spain	Schooner	Currently	1984	31	26,45	7			more
Avanti; ENI 02718267; Netherlands	Clipper	Currently	1898	31,77		5,95	1,25		
Avatar; Netherlands	Schooner	Currently	1941	34,5		6,4	2,8	450	
Avondrood; ENI 03350185; Netherlands	Clipper	Currently	1900	37,98		6,50	1,35	400	
Avontuur; ENI 03030398; Netherlands	Clipper	Currently	1911	31,44		5,02	0,93	350	
Babbelaer; ENI 02211253; Netherlands}	Dutch barge, tjalk	Currently	1914	23,00	20,09	4,30	0,80	160	
Bel Espoir II; France	Schooner	Currently	1944	38,50	29,30	7,20	2,80	650	more
Belem; IMO 8622983; France	Barque	Currently	1896	58,00	50,96	8,80	3,50	1200	more
Bisschop van Arkel; ENI 02605485; Netherlands	Schooner	Currently	1900	26,6		5,7	1,8	420	more
Bontekoe; ENI 02101903; Netherlands	Clipper	Currently	1909	33,86		6,10		383,5	
Brandaris; ENI 02205520; Netherlands	Schooner	Currently	1905	30		6	2	450	
Brandende Liefde LE-7; ENI 02211075; Netherlands	Dutch barge, aak	Currently	2004	19,00	16,50	5,20	1,00	198	
Bree Sant; ENI 02101600; Netherlands	Clipper	Currently	1904	32,00		6,10		400	more
Carpe Diem Netherlands	Dutch barge, tjalk	Currently	1901	30	22,70	5,35	1,15	230	
Christian Radich; IMO 5071729; Norway	Full-rigged ship	Currently	1937	72,50	62,50	9,80	4,90	1234	more
Dageraad; ENI 02717838; Netherlands	Clipper	Currently	1910	41,70	38,73	6,72	1,35		
Dar Młodzieży; IMO 7821075; Poland	Full-rigged ship	Currently	1982	108,815	94,80	14,00	6,37	3015	more
De Egelantier Netherlands	Dutch barge, tjalk	Currently	1889	25,00		4,90	1,20		
De Hoge Wier; ENI 3330144; Netherlands	Clipper	Currently	1899	24,95		5,24	0,99	313	
De Nieuwe Liefde; IMO 5221697; Netherlands	Barquentine	Currently	1937	50		7	2,50	760	more
De Rederijker; ENI 02014117; Netherlands	Dutch barge, tjalk	Currently	2001	28.00	25.00	5,40	1,30		
De Rijkswaterstaat 1 ENI 3900024; Netherlands	Clipper	Currently	1912	30	22	4	1,8		more
De Titaan; ENI 02325121; Netherlands	Dutch barge, tjalk	Currently	2002	27,6	25	5,8		360	more
De Vrijheid; ENI 03010792; Netherlands	Clipper	Currently	1901		23,90	4,50		200	
Dolce Vita ENI 03330057; Netherlands	Dutch barge, tjalk	Currently	1906	25,00	23,38	5,08	1,30	230	
Duet United Kingdom	Yacht	Currently	1912	21,95	19,20	3,38			
Dy Abt fan Starum; ENI 03350025; Netherlands	Clipper	Currently	1917	30		5,20			
Eendracht; IMO 8814275; Netherlands	Schooner	Currently	1989	59,08		12,30	5	1206	more
Eldorado; ENI; Netherlands	Clipper	Currently	1964	38,00		6,50	3,00	320	more
Elizabeth; ENI 03170405; Netherlands	Clipper	Currently	1913	41,00		6,90	1,35	445	
Esmeralda; IMO 8642799; Chile	Barquentine	Currently	1953	113,00	94,00	13,00	6,00	2870	more
Étoile du Roy France	Frigate	Currently	1996	46	38	10	3	790	more
Europa; IMO 8951932; Netherlands	Barque	Currently	1911	55,10	48,60	7,45	3,90	1200	more
Fortuna; ENI 02212267; Netherlands	Schooner	Currently	1913	34,50		5,85	1,50		more
Frije Fûgel LE 194; Netherlands	Durch barge, aak		2000	16,25		5,50	0,90	100	
Frisius van Adel; ENI 03170308; Netherlands	Clipper	Currently	1906	45,00	37,00	6,10		478	
Gladan Sweden	Schooner	Currently	1947	39,3	34,4	7,2	4,2	680	more
Götheborg; IMO 8646678; Sweden	Full-rigged ship	Currently	2002	58,50	40,90	11,00	5,25	1964	more
Grote Beer; ENI 02304739; Netherlands	Clipper	Currently	1911	41,50		6,60	1,20	500	
Guayas; IMO 6126970; Ecuador	Barque	Currently	1977	78,40	56,10	10,16	4,40	1410	more
Gulden Leeuw; IMO 5085897; Netherlands	Schooner	Currently	1937	70,10	51,73	8,60	4,20	1400	more
Halve Maen United States	Yacht (replica)	Currently	1989	28,96	25,9	5,3	2,6	256	more
Hanzestad; ENI 02212062; Netherlands	Canal boat	Currently	2005	30		6,70	130		
Hendrika Bartelds; IMO 8647141; Netherlands	Schooner	Currently	1918	49,00		6,65	2,80	645	more
HVAL; Netherlands		Currently	2008	21,5		5,5	1,8		
Iris; ENI 02315150; Netherlands	Sailing barge	Currently	1916	36		6,7	2,9	590	more
Iskra Orp; IMO 8225450; Poland	Barquentine	Currently	1982	49,00	40,00	8,00	3,70	955	more
Jantje Netherlands	Brigantine	Currently	1930	28	20	5,90	2,40	280	more
Johanna Lucretia United Kingdom	Schooner	Currently	1945	29,20	19,93	5,50	2,80	374,2	more
J.R.Tolkien; IMO 7017064; Netherlands	Schooner	Currently	1964	41,7		7,8	3	828	more
Kaliakra; IMO 8308410; Bulgaria	Barquentine	Currently	1984	49,90	42,80	8,00	3,80	885	more
Kamper Kogge; ENI 02322313; Netherlands	Cog	Currently	1998	21,6		7,56	1,9	140	more
Kapitan Borchardt; IMO 5375008; Poland	Schooner	Currently	1918	45,00	33,84	7,02	2,90	600	more
Kikkerkoning Netherlands	Dutch barge, aak		1995	14,35		5,00	1,20	120	
Koh-i-Noor; ENI 02606042; Netherlands	Clipper	Currently	1904	37	27	7	2,45	560	
Korevaer; ENI 02302217; Netherlands	Clipper	Currently	1911	37,25		6,06	1,60		
Korneliske Ykes II WB 12; Netherlands	Dutch barge, aak		2009	18,43		5,25	1,30	155	
Kruzenshtern; IMO 6822979; Russia	Barque	Currently	1926	114,50	104,30	14,05	7,17	3655	more
La Cancalaise France	Fishing ship		1987	30,0	18,1	4,8	2,5	350	more
La Grace Czech Republic	Brig	Currently	2010	32,3	23,8	6,06	2,8	364	more
Loth Loriën; IMO 5254151; Netherlands	Barquentine	Currently	1907	48.00		7,20	3,10	572	more
Mare fan Fryslan; ENI 03270613; Netherlands	Schooner		1962	62,00	49,99	7,20	1,50	650	
Mare Frisium; IMO 5344592; Netherlands	Schooner	Currently	1916	49,00	34,00	6,70	2,80	634	more
Marie Galante; ENI 02008399; IMO 5096743; Netherlands	Lugger	Currently	1915	38,00	27,00	6,80	2,80	480	more
Marjorie; Belgium	Barquentine	Currently	1932	55	44	7	2,65	685	
Maybe United Kingdom	Kits	Currently	1929	27	22,00	6	3,2		more
Mir; IMO 8501701; Russia	Full-rigged ship	Currently	1987	109,40	94,20	14,00	6,40	2771	more
Mercedes; IMO 5156658; Netherlands	Brig	Currently	1958	50,0	42,00	7,60	3,60	900	more
Morgana; ENI 03030094; Netherlands	Schooner	Currently	1924	34,9		6,6	1,4	435	
Morgenster; IMO 5241657; Netherlands	Brig	Currently	1919	48	39	6	2,40	600	more
Mutin France	Cutter	Currently	1927	33		6,35	3,4	312	more
Nadezhda; IMO 1936010; Russia	Schooner		1912	39	36	6,5	3,5	460	more
Nao Victoria Spain	Dutch barge, kraak	Currently	1992	36,6	25,9	6			more
Nil Desperandum; ENI 03230104; Netherlands	Clipper	Currently	1894	42,00	35,56	6,60	1,20		more
Noorderlicht; ENI 02201132; Netherlands	Clipper	Currently	1895	52,25	41,00	6,13	1,35	458	
Oosterschelde; IMO 5347221; Netherlands	Schooner	Currently	1918	50,00	40,12	7,50	3,00	891	more
Oostvogel; ENI 02307581; Netherlands	Clipper	Currently	1898	39		7,50	1,40	540	
Pedro Doncker ENI 02605815; IMO 8136154; Netherlands	Barquentine	Currently	1974	42,00	34,00	7,50	3,60	570	more
Pelikaan; ENI 02208802; Netherlands	Dutch barge, tjalk	Currently	1904	20,3		4,8		250	
Pogoria; IMO 7911210; Poland	Barquentine	Currently	1980	46,80	40,00	8,00	3,70	1050	more
Rara Avis France	Schooner	Currently	1957	30	26	7	1,50	500	more
Regina Maris; ENI 2605788; IMO 7025126; Netherlands	Schooner	Currently	1978	48,00	36,00	6,90	2,80	650	more
Saeftinghe; Netherlands	Dutch barge, aak		1930	15,00		4,60	1,10	134	
Saffier; ENI 02605977; Netherlands	Dutch barge, tjalk	Currently	1998	25	23	5	1,10	230	
Sagres; IMO 8642579; Portugal	Barque	Currently	1937	89,50	81,20	12,00	5,50	1796	more
Sanne Sophia; ENI 02100148; Netherlands	Clipper	Currently	1886	53,00		7,00	1,60	1000	more
Santa Maria Manuela; IMO 5312628; Portugal	Lugger	Currently	1937	68,64		9,9		1130	more
Schuttevaer; ENI 02206391; Netherlands	Dutch barge, tjalk	Currently	1910	43		5,80	1,30	500	
Sedov; IMO 7946356; Russia	Barque	Currently	1921	117,50	109,00	14,70	6,70	4192	more
Selene; ENI 03041120; Netherlands	Dutch barge, tjalk	Currently	1902	31		5,5	1,10	230	
Soeverein; ENI 02309784; Netherlands	Merchant ship	Currently	1956	58		7,20	2,10	900	more
Stad Amsterdam; IMO 9185554; Netherlands	Full-rigged ship	Currently	2000	78,00	60,50	10,50	4,20	2200	more
Statsraad Lehmkuhl; IMO 5339248; Norway	Barque	Currently	1914	98,00	87,50	12,60	5,10	2200	more
Stedemaeght; ENI 02206581; Netherlands	Barque	Currently	1926	60		7	2,9	1000	more
Strúner HL-3 Netherlands	Dutch barge, aak	Currently	2006	14,25		4,71	0,8	136,21	
Succes; ENI 02102166; Netherlands	Clipper	Currently	1909	39,00		6,85	1,35	420	more
Summertime; ENI 03050631; Netherlands	Barquentine	Currently	1937	70		6,74	1,90	1000	more
Suydersee; ENI 03050848; Netherlands	Clipper	Currently	1906	38		6,11		400	
Swaensborgh; IMO 8138255; Netherlands	Schooner	Currently	1907	47,00	41,00	5,85	2,30	500	more
Team Brunel Netherlands	Race machine	Currently	2014	22.14	20.00	5.60	4.78	578	more
Tecla; ENI 02717407; Netherlands	Lugger	Currently	1915	38	28	6,55	2,7	370	more
Thalassa; IMO 8101276; Netherlands	Barquentine	Currently	1980	48,00	38,00	8,00	3,80	800	more
Tsjerk Hiddes; ENI 02304407; Netherlands	Dutch barge, aak	Currently	1881	53	42,25	6,80	1,40	525	more
Toekomst; ENI 02325123; Netherlands	Dutch barge, tjalk	Currently	2002	34	27,50	5,60	1,20	595	
TS Rupel; Belgium	Schooner	Currently	1996	22,5	19,83	4,8		200	more
Tres Hombres Sierra Leone	Cutter	Currently	W.O.II	32,00	25	6,40	3	315	more
Twee Gebroeders; ENI 02317590; Netherlands	Dutch barge	Currently	1900	23,83		4,86	1,00	235	
Twister Netherlands	Schoener	Currently	1902	36,00	28,85	6,20	3	340	
Zr.Ms. Urania Netherlands	Ketch	Currently	2004	27		6		400	more
Utrecht; ENI 02015523; Netherlands	Yacht	Currently	2003	23,50		5,50	1,35		more
Vliegende Hollander; Netherlands	Clipper	Currently	1892	39,02		6,05	1,40	540	
Voorwaarts Voorwaarts; ENI 02204773; Netherlands	Dutch barge, tjalk	Currently	1899	26,90		5,41	1,50	253	
Vrijheid; ENI 02200350; Netherlands	Schooner	Currently	1898	48		7	2,10		
Welvaart; ENI 03020244; Netherlands	Clipper	Currently	1906	32,22		6,45	1,35		
Willem Barentsz; ENI 02205587; Netherlands	Clipper	Currently	1931	49,70	41,00	6,10	1,80	550	more
Wylde Swan; IMO 5126718; Netherlands	Schooner	Currently	1920	62,00		7,30	3,50	1130	more
Young Endeavour; IMO 8971164; Australia	Brigantine	Currently	1988	44,00	35,00	7,80	4,00	511	more
Zeemeeuw; IMO 5398115; ENI 02013079; Netherlands	Lugger	Currently	1924	37,0		6,60	1,50	425	
Zephyr; IMO 8918590; ENI 02606247; Netherlands	Schooner	Currently	1931	36	28,90	6	2,20	360	more
Zuiderzee; IMO 9097264; Netherlands	Schooner	Currently	1909	40,00	30,76	6,80	2,30	440	more
Zwarte Valk; ENI 03250257; Netherlands	Clipper	Currently	1889	27,5		5,75	0,75	220	
