= Tall Ships Races =

Sail training ship races

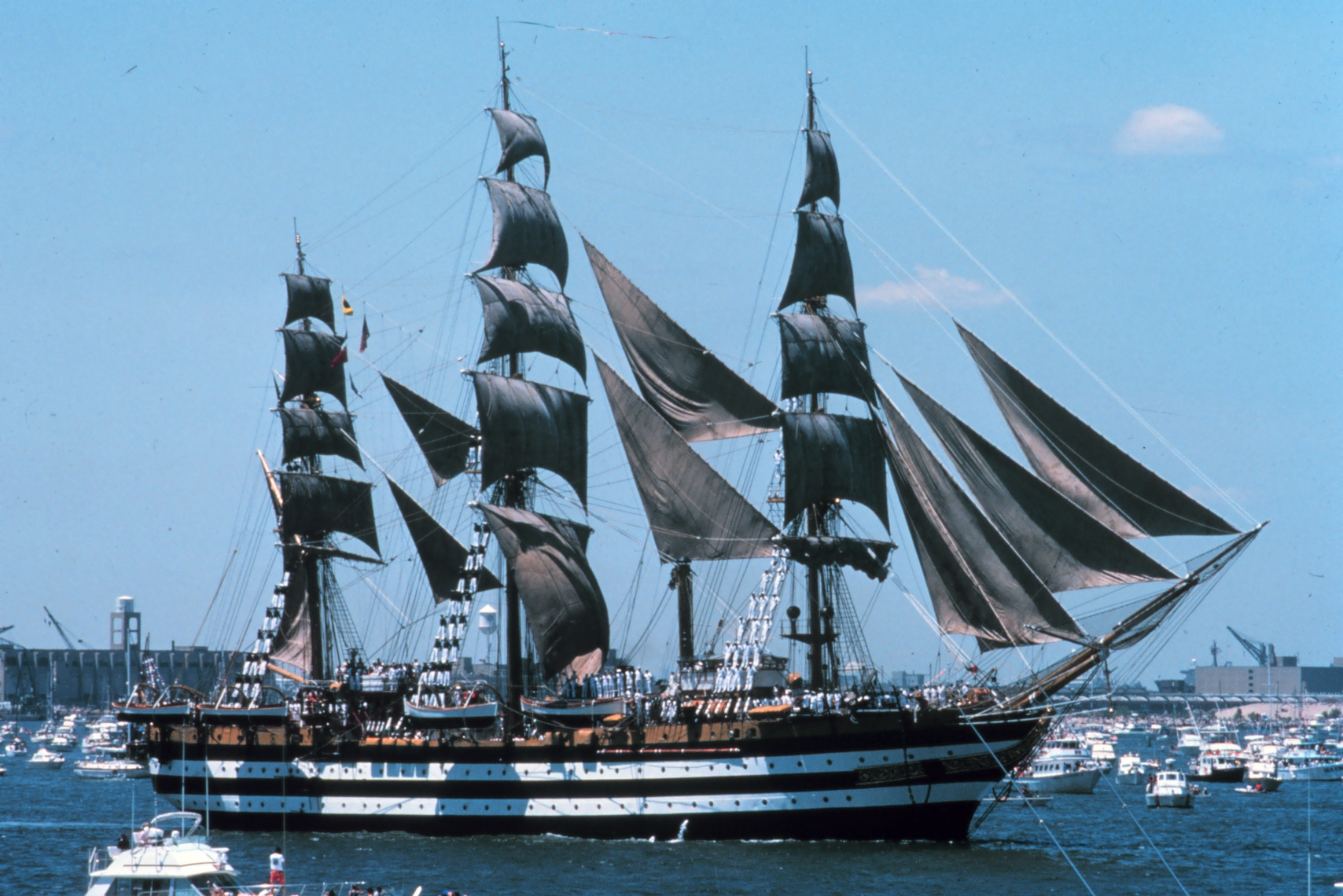
Italian tall ship Amerigo Vespucci in New York Harbor, 1976

The Tall Ships Races are races for sail training "tall ships" (sailing ships). The races are designed to encourage international friendship and training for young people in the art of sailing. The races are held annually in European waters and consists of two racing legs of several hundred nautical miles, and a "cruise in company" between the legs. Over one half of the crew of each ship participating in the races must consist of young people.

Between 1973 and 2003 the races were known as The Cutty Sark Tall Ships Races, having been sponsored by Cutty Sark whisky. From 2004 to 2010 the races were supported by the City, Province and Port of Antwerp. The sponsor of the Tall Ships Races 2010–2014 was the city of Szczecin.

== Tall ships ==
By the 21st century, "tall ship" is often used generically for large, classic, sailing vessels, but is also a technically defined term by Sail Training International. The definitions are subject to various technicalities, but by 2011 there are only two size classes, class A is square-rigged vessels and all other vessels over 40 m LOA, and classes B/C/D are 9.14 m to under 40 m LOA. Participating vessels are crewed by largely cadets or trainees who are partaking in sail training, 50 percent of which must be aged between 15 and 25 years of age and who do not need any previous experience. Thus, tall ship does not describe a specific type of sailing vessel, but rather a monohull sailing vessel of at least 9.4 metres (30 ft) that is conducting sail training and education under sail voyages. Participating ships range from yachts to the large square-rigged sail training ships run by charities, schools and navies of many countries.

== Race ==
After World War II, tall ships were a dying breed, having lost out to steam-powered ships several decades before. It was a retired solicitor from London, Bernard Morgan, who first dreamed up the idea of bringing young cadets and seamen under training together from around the world to participate in a friendly competition. The Portuguese Ambassador to the UK, Pedro Teotónio Pereira, was a big supporter of this original idea and believed that such a race would bring together the youth of the world's seafaring peoples. These two figures started discussions in 1953 and three years later they saw their vision become a reality. The first Tall Ships' race was held in 1956. It was a race of 20 of the world's remaining large sailing ships. The race was from Torquay, Devon to Lisbon, and was meant to be a last farewell to the era of the great sailing ships. Public interest was so intense, however, that race organizers founded the Sail Training International association to direct the planning of future events. Since then Tall Ships' Races have occurred annually in various parts of the world, with millions of spectators. Today, the race attracts more than a hundred ships, among these some of the largest sailing ships in existence, like the Portuguese Sagres. The 50th Anniversary Tall Ships' Races took place during July and August 2006 and was started by the patron, Prince Philip, Duke of Edinburgh, who also started the first race in 1956.

== Years ==
- 1978 – Gothenburg (Sweden) – Great Yarmouth (United Kingdom) – Oslo (Norway)
- 1979 – Fowey (United Kingdom) – Isle of Man
- 1980 – Kiel (West Germany) – Karlskrona (Sweden) – Frederikshavn (Denmark) – Amsterdam (Netherlands)
- 1981 – Great Yarmouth (United Kingdom) – Ostend (Belgium)
- 1982 – Falmouth (United Kingdom) – Lisbon (Portugal) – Vigo (Spain) – Southampton (United Kingdom)
- 1983 – Travemünde (West Germany) – Karlskrona (Sweden) – Weymouth (United Kingdom) – Saint-Malo (France)
- 1984 – Trans-Atlantic: Saint-Malo (France) – Canary Islands (Spain) (stop off) – San Juan (Puerto Rico) – Bermuda – Portsmouth (Canada) – Halifax (Canada) – Gaspe (Canada) – Quebec City (Canada) – Sydney (Canada) – Norrköping (Sweden) (rally) – Flensburg (West Germany) (rally) – Frederikshavn (Denmark) – Greenock (United Kingdom) – Liverpool (United Kingdom)
- 1985 – Bremerhaven (West Germany) – Chatham (United Kingdom) – Bruges-Zeebrugge (Belgium) – Amsterdam (Netherlands)
- 1986 – Delfzijl (Netherlands) – Newcastle upon Tyne (United Kingdom) – Bremerhaven (West Germany) – Larvik (Norway) – Gothenburg (Sweden)
- 1987 – Weymouth (United Kingdom) – Cherbourg (France)
- 1988 – Karlskrona (Sweden) – Helsinki (Finland) – Mariehamn (Finland) – Copenhagen (Denmark)
- 1989 – London (United Kingdom) – Hamburg (West Germany) – Malmö (Sweden) – Travemünde (West Germany)
- 1990 – Plymouth (United Kingdom) – A Coruña (Spain) – Bordeaux (France) – Bruges-Zeebrugge (Belgium)
- 1991 – Milford Haven (United Kingdom) – Cork (Ireland) – Belfast (United Kingdom) – Aberdeen (United Kingdom) – Delfzijl (Netherlands)
- 1992 – Trans-Atlantic: Genoa (Italy) – Lisbon (Portugal) – Cádiz (Spain) -Canary Islands (Spain) – San Juan (Puerto Rico) – Bahamas – New York City (United States) – Boston (United States) – Liverpool (United Kingdom)
- 1992 – Karlskrona (Sweden) – Kotka (Finland) – Tallinn (Estonia) – Gdynia (Poland)
- 1993 – Newcastle upon Tyne (United Kingdom) – Bergen (Norway) – Larvik (Norway) – Esbjerg (Denmark) – Antwerp (Belgium), fleet visit
- 1994 – Weymouth (United Kingdom) – A Coruña (Spain) – Porto (Portugal) – Saint-Malo (France)
- 1995 – Edinburgh (United Kingdom) – Bremerhaven (Germany) – Frederikshavn (Denmark) – Amsterdam (Netherlands) – Zeebrugge (Belgium)
- 1996 – St Petersburg (Russia) – Kotka (Finland) – Turku (Finland) – Copenhagen (Denmark)
- 1997 – Aberdeen (United Kingdom) – Trondheim (Norway) – Stavanger (Norway) – Gothenburg (Sweden)
- 1998 – Falmouth (United Kingdom) – Lisbon (Portugal) – Vigo (Spain) – Dublin (Ireland)
- 1999 – St Malo (France) – Greenock (United Kingdom) – Lerwick (United Kingdom) – Aalborg (Denmark)
- 2000 – Trans-Atlantic: Southampton (United Kingdom) – Cádiz (Spain) – Genoa (Italy) – Cádiz (Spain) – Bermuda (Bermuda) – Boston (United States) – Halifax (Canada) – Amsterdam (Netherlands)
- 2001 – Antwerp (Belgium) – Ålesund (Norway) – Bergen (Norway) – Esbjerg (Denmark)
- 2002 – Alicante (Spain) – Málaga (Spain) – A Coruña (Spain) – Santander (Spain) – Portsmouth (United Kingdom)
- 2003 – Gdynia (Poland) – Turku (Finland) – Riga (Latvia) – Travemünde (Germany)
- 2004 – Antwerp (Belgium) – Aalborg (Denmark) – Stavanger (Norway) – Cuxhaven (Germany)
- 2005 – Waterford (Ireland) – Cherbourg-Octeville (France) – Newcastle-Gateshead (United Kingdom) – Fredrikstad (Norway) – Torbay (United Kingdom) – Santander (Spain)
- 2006 – Saint-Malo (France) – Lisbon (Portugal) – Cádiz (Spain) – A Coruña (Spain) – Antwerp (Belgium)
- 2007 – Baltic: Aarhus (Denmark) – Kotka (Finland) – Stockholm (Sweden) – Szczecin (Poland)
- 2007 – Mediterranean: Barcelona (Spain) – Genoa (Italy) – Toulon (France) – Alicante (Spain)
- 2008 – Liverpool (United Kingdom) – Måløy (Norway) – Bergen (Norway) – Den Helder (Netherlands)
- 2009 – Baltic: Gdynia (Poland) – St Petersburg (Russia) – Turku (Finland) – Klaipėda (Lithuania)
- 2009 – Trans-Atlantic: Vigo (Spain) – Tenerife (Canary Islands) – Bermuda – Charleston (United States) – Boston (United States) – Halifax (Canada) – Belfast (United Kingdom)
- 2010 – Antwerp (Belgium) – Aalborg (Denmark) – Kristiansand (Norway) – Hartlepool (United Kingdom)
- 2011 – Waterford (Ireland) – Greenock (United Kingdom) – Lerwick (United Kingdom) – Stavanger (Norway) – Halmstad (Sweden)
- 2012 – Saint-Malo (France) – Lisbon (Portugal) – Cádiz (Spain) – A Coruña – Dublin (Ireland)
- 2013 – Aarhus (Denmark) – Helsinki (Finland) – Riga (Latvia) – Szczecin (Poland)
- 2014 – Harlingen (Netherlands) – Fredrikstad (Norway) – Bergen (Norway) – Esbjerg (Denmark)
- 2015 – Belfast (United Kingdom) – Ålesund (Norway) – Kristiansand (Norway) – Aalborg (Denmark)
- 2016 – Antwerp (Belgium) – Lisbon (Portugal) – Cádiz (Spain) – A Coruña (Spain) – Blyth (United Kingdom)
- 2017 – Halmstad (Sweden) – Kotka (Finland) – Turku (Finland) – Klaipėda (Lithuania) – Szczecin (Poland)
- 2018 – Sunderland (United Kingdom) – Esbjerg (Denmark) – Stavanger (Norway) – Harlingen (Netherlands)
- 2019 – Aalborg (Denmark) – Fredrikstad (Norway) – Bergen (Norway) – Aarhus (Denmark) – Antwerp (Belgium)
- 2020 – Lisbon (Portugal) – Cádiz (Spain) – A Coruña (Spain) – Dunkirk (France)
- 2021 – Klaipėda (Lithuania) – Turku (Finland) – Tallinn (Estonia) – Mariehamn (Finland) – Szczecin (Poland)
- 2022 – Esbjerg (Denmark) – Harlingen (Netherlands) – Antwerp (Belgium) – Aalborg (Denmark)
- 2023 – Den Helder (Netherlands) – Hartlepool (United Kingdom) – Fredrikstad (Norway) – Lerwick (Shetland Islands) – Arendal (Norway)
- 2024 – Klaipeda (Lithuania) – Helsinki (Finland) – Tallinn (Estonia) – Turku (Finland) – Mariehamn (Finland) – Szczecin (Poland)
- 2025 – Le Havre (France) – Dunkirk (France) – Aberdeen (United Kingdom) – Kristiansand (Norway) – Esbjerg (Denmark)
- 2026 – Aarhus (Denmark) – Harlingen (The Netherlands) – Antwerp (Belgium) – Stavanger (Norway) – Aalborg (Denmark)
- 2027 – Bordeaux (France) – A Coruña (Spain) – Sines (Portugal)
- 2028 – Kiel (Germany) – Turku (Finland) – Tallinn (Estonia) – Szczecin (Poland)
- 2029 – TBA
- 2030 – Antwerp (Belgium)

== Incidents ==
The bark Marques sank in a squall during the 1984 race. 19 of the 28 crew were killed.

In the 2013 race, the Norwegian vessel Wyvern was shipwrecked between the Swedish islands of Gotland and Öland in the Baltic Sea. The crew were rescued. A man from the Dutch schooner Wylde Swan was presumed drowned after he and two others from the schooner had boarded the Wyvern in an attempt to save it from going down.

== Sail Training International ==
The Tall Ships' Races are organised by Sail Training International (STI) an international association of national sail training organisations devoted to promoting "the education and development of young people of all nationalities, religions and social backgrounds, through sail training".

== Some ships that have participated ==
- Alexander von Humboldt - German Barque (Converted to a botel by 2014).
- Amerigo Vespucci - Italian Navy training ship.
- Arethusa Ketch
- Asgard II - Irish sail training ship (lost 2008).
- Astrid - Dutch tall ship (lost 2013).
- Atyla
- Auno - a Norwegian gaff ketch.
- Belle Poule (built in 1932) - French Navy training schooner which together with the Etoile, its sister ship, has been participating in the Tall Ship Race since 1958. In 2009, the Belle Poule and the Etoile crossed the Atlantic Ocean for the first time during the Tall Ship Atlantic Challenge.
- Capitán Miranda schooner, Uruguayan Navy training ship.
- Challenge Wales - Wales' Tall Ship. Took part in its first Tall Ships Regatta in 2012 and its first Tall Ships Race in 2016.
- Christian Radich - Norwegian full-rigged training ship; her homeport is Oslo.
- Cisne Branco - Brazilian full-rigged training ship.
- Concordia - Canadian Barquentine (lost 2010).
- Creole, Tall Ship Race (1980) from Boston (USA) training ship (DK)
- UAM Creoula - a four-masted Portuguese sail training ship
- Cuauhtémoc - Mexican Navy officer-training ship (winner on two occasions).
- Danmark - Danish full-rigged training ship built in Nakskov, Denmark 1933.
- Dar Młodzieży - a three-masted Polish full-rigged ship (built in 1982).
- Dar Pomorza - winner of 1972 and 1980 races, a three-masted Polish full-rigged ship (built in 1909, decommissioned in 1980 and replaced by the Dar Mlodziezy, see above).
- Eagle - training vessel for the U.S. Coast Guard, most recently participated in 2005.
- Eendracht - Dutch schooner owned by Stichting het Zeilend Zeeschip (Foundation the Sailing Seaship).
- Schooner Ernestina - the official vessel of the Commonwealth of Massachusetts.
- Esmeralda - Training vessel for the Chilean Navy, won in 1982 and 1990.
- Étoile - French Navy training schooner which together with the Belle Poule, its sister ship, has been participating in the Tall Ships' Race since 1958. In 2009, the Etoile and the Belle Poule crossed the Atlantic Ocean for the first time during the Tall Ship Atlantic Challenge.
- Eye of the Wind - participated several times while operated by Adventure under Sail between 1973 and 2000
- HMS Falken - a two-masted Swedish Naval training schooner.
- Far Barcelona - an 1874 jacket restored at the Consorci El Far as vessel school, Barcelona-Spain.
- Georg Stage - Danish Ship.
- HMS Gladan - a two-masted Swedish Naval training schooner.
- Gloria - Colombian Barque.
- Golden Quest - a three-masted Swedish barque.
- Gorch Fock (built in 1958).
- Iskra (built in 1982).
- Gulden leeuw - a three-masted Dutch topsail schooner.
- Jens Krogh - a Danish gaff ketch.
- Johann Smidt (ex Eendracht) (German Wikipedia) - a two-masted German schooner, class B (length between 30.5 and 46.5 m) winner in 1992 and 2000.
- Jolie Brise - a French pilot cutter, three times winner of the Fastnet Ocean Race, two times overall winner of the Tall Ships' Races. Owned maintained and sailed by Dauntsey's School.
- Juan de Lángara - Spanish training schooner, won the Friend's Ships Trophy in 2006 and is a regular participant in Tall Ships Races from 1995.
- Kaliakra - Bulgarian.
- Kruzenshtern - Russian four-masted barque, one of the last genuine windjammers under sail.
- La Grace- a Czech replica of Augustine Herman's historical ship (2nd half of 18 century). Winner of TSRace 2007. link:
- Libertad - Argentine Ship.
- LOA- a Danish barquentine first entered in 2009.
- STS Lord Nelson - Jubilee Sailing Trust - Southampton.
- Malcolm Miller - sistership of the three-mast schooner Sir Winston Churchill, sail training vessel, took part in 1991
- Marques - a British bark that sank during the 1984 race
- Maybe - a 1920s Dutch sailing ketch which took part in the first tall ships race.
- Mercator - a Belgian merchant marine three-masted barquentine, winner of the Oslo ~ Oostende race in 1960.
- STS Mir - a three-masted Russian training ship.
- Mircea - a three-masted Romanian sail training ship.
- Moosk - a 100-year-old Cornish Yawl.
- Morgenster - a Dutch brig.
- Morning Star of Revelation - a British 62 ft (19 m) gaff ketch.
- Mutin - French Navy's oldest training ship which was used during WW2 as an operational unit by the British Special Operations Executives (SOE).
- Ocean Scout - a Bermuda rigged Oyster 49 ketch launched in 1994 operated by the UK scout sail training charity, Adventures Offshore. It is the elder sister ship to Offshore Scout.
- Offshore Scout - a Bermuda rigged Oyster 49 ketch launched in 1997 operated by the UK scout sail training charity, Adventures Offshore. It is the elder sister ship to Ocean Scout.
- Pelican of London - a UK main-mast barquentine.
- Pogoria - a three-masted Polish barquentine (built in 1980).
- Prince William
- Roald Amundsen - a German brig ST G 508.
- Rona II - a ketch rigged Oyster 68
- TS Royalist (1971) - TS Royalist is a brig owned and operated as a sail training ship by the Sea Cadet Corps of the United Kingdom tall ships.
- Sagita - a Danish schooner.
- NRP Sagres (ex Rickmer Rickmers) - Portuguese training ship.
- Sedov - Russian Barque.
- Seute Deern II (ex Noona Dan) (German Wikipedia) - a two-masted German ketch, former school ship.
- Shtandart - replica of a Russian 18th century frigate (built in 1999).

'Sir Winston Churchill', British Sail Training Association - three masted Schooner, launched 1966, Private Yacht from 2000.

- KRI Dewaruci - a three-masted Indonesian barque, Naval cadet training ship
- Skibladner II - a Danish gaff ketch
- Skonnerten Jylland - a Danish three mast staging sail schooner that functions as a sailing youth home
- Sørlandet - Norway, the oldest operative full-rigged ship in the world.
- Stad Amsterdam - Dutch clipper, built as a charter and cruise ship. She won in 2001.
- Statsraad Lehmkuhl - a three-masted Norwegian barque whose homeport is Bergen.
- Stavros S Niarchos - British sail training ship.
- The Swan - Shetland ship.
- Swan fan Makkum - Dutch Brigantine.
- INS Tarangini - a three-masted Indian barque.
- Tecla Dutch Ketch.
- SV Tenacious - Jubilee Sailing Trust - Southampton.
- Tokka-Lotta - a 42-foot Bermuda sloop rigged training vessel for the Sea Scouts of Naantali, Finland
- HMS Trincomalee - Britain's oldest warship afloat. Will remain in Hartlepool.
- Vega Gamleby - Swedish schooner, regular participant since 2013.
- Windrose (of Amsterdam) - Fastest on the line, 2003.

== See also ==
- The Great Tea Race of 1866
- Grain race
