= Esther Jensen =

Danish sailing vessel

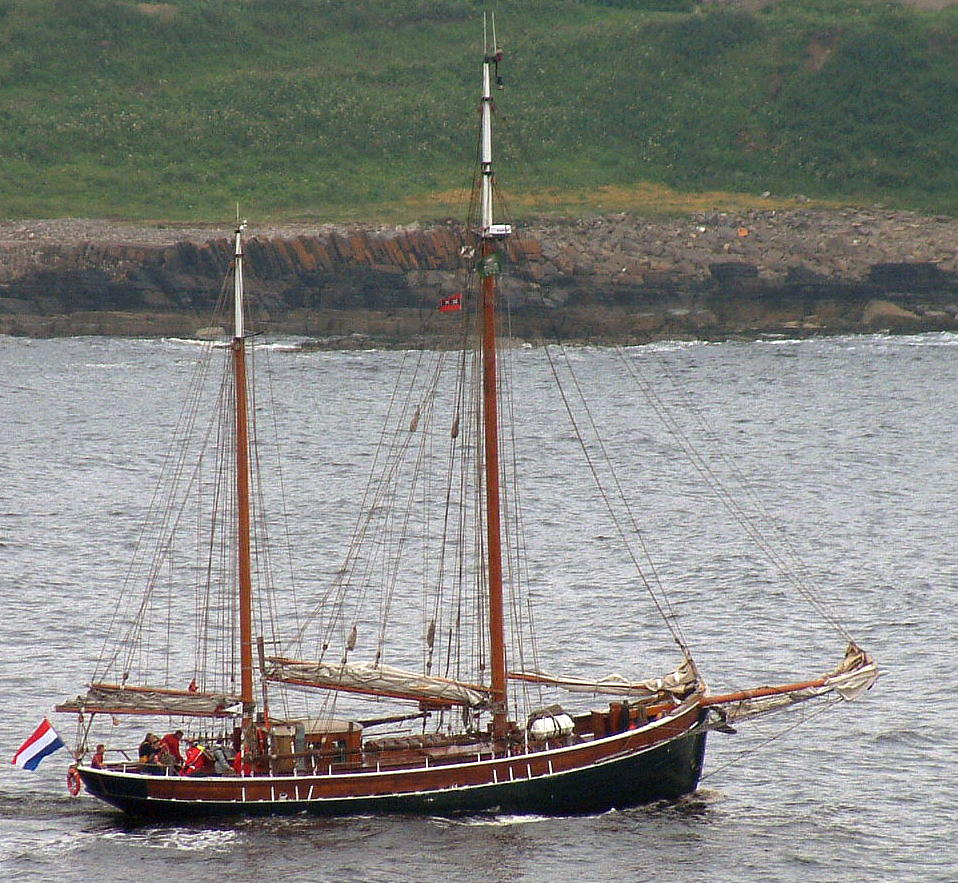

History

Denmark
- Name: Esther Jensen
- Launched: 1939
- Home port: Aarhus
- Status: In service

General characteristics
- Length: 24.20 m (79 ft 5 in)
- Beam: 5.00 m (16 ft 5 in)
- Draught: 2.25 m (7 ft 5 in)
- Propulsion: Sails
- Sail plan: Ketch
- Capacity: 10 passengers

The Esther Jensen is a gaff-rigged ketch built in 1939 in Denmark.

== History ==
Built in 1939 in Denmark, the Esther Jensen was used as a fishing boat initially.

In 1992, she was bought by Theo van Tricht, and restored and modernised. She now sails in European and Polar waters as a sail training vessel, offering escorted sailing holidays. She is eligible to take part in The Tall Ships' Races organised by Sail Training International.

In 2022, she was brought back to Denmark and is once again sailing under the Danish flag.
