= Kaliakra (ship) =

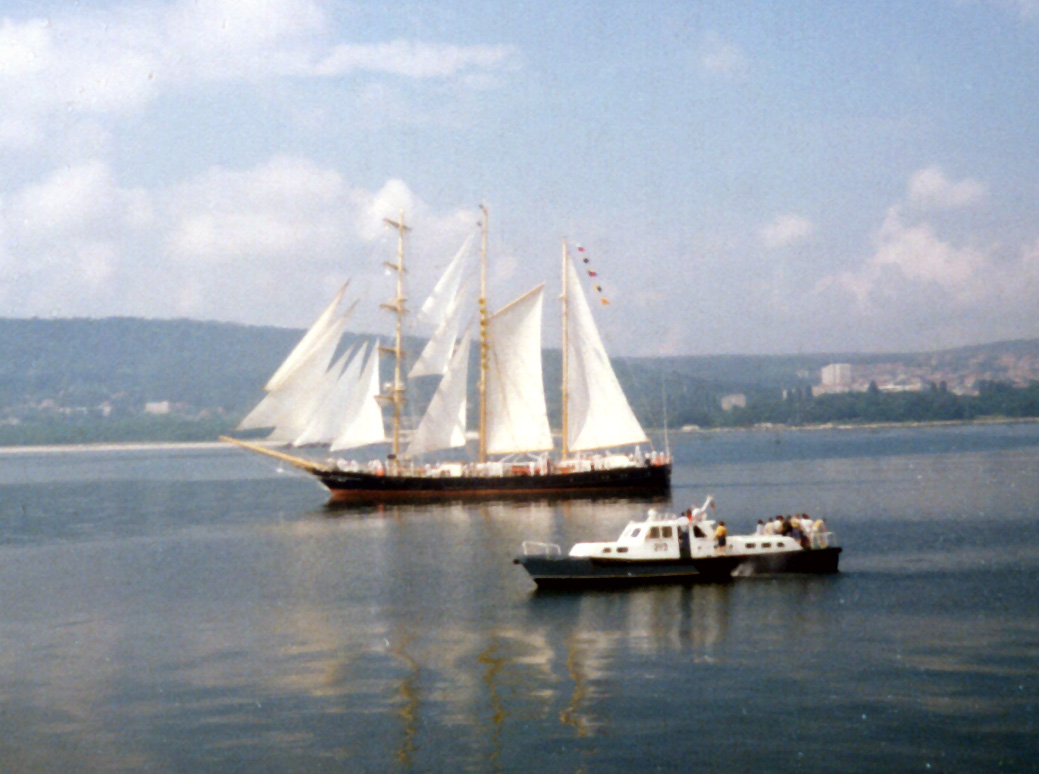
- STV Kaliakra

History

Bulgaria
- Name: STV Kaliakra
- Owner: Bulgarian Maritime Training Centre
- Operator: Navigation Maritime Bulgare
- Builder: Gdańsk Shipyard
- Launched: 1984
- Homeport: Varna, Bulgaria
- Identification: IMO number: 8308410; MMSI number: 207037000; Callsign: LZKY
- Status: Active

General characteristics
- Class & type: Barquentine Class A
- Displacement: 392 tons, metric
- Length: 52 meters (171 feet) overall
- Beam: 8 meters (26 feet)
- Draft: 3.5–4 meters (11–13 feet)
- Installed power: Diesel power plant, 228 kW
- Complement: 15 permanent crew, 34 cadets

The Sail Training Vessel Kaliakra (Known also as STV Kaliakra, Bulgarian: Калиакра) is a barquentine, built in 1984 at the Gdańsk Shipyard, after the plans of the Polish technical designer Zygmunt Choreń. She is a property of Bulgarian Maritime Training Centre and is operated by Navigation Maritime Bulgare, Bulgaria. The ship's home port is Varna, Bulgaria.

== The ship ==
The general perception is that Kaliakra is a reproduction of a ship of the same name from the time before World War I. In fact, she is one of three modern sister ships designed for training, the other two being STS Pogoria and ORP Iskra. Now she is used for training the Naval Cadets from Nikola Vaptsarov Naval Academy in Varna, Bulgaria.

The ship is one of the fastest tall ships in the world. She has participated on relatively regular basis in the Cutty Sark Tall Ships regatta, organized by the Sail Training International (STI) Association. During the Columbus Race in 1992, dedicated to the 500 years jubilee of the discovery of America, Kaliakra sailed the Atlantic Ocean twice and finished third out of 143 ships.

Onboard Kaliakra have been Juan Carlos of Spain, Crown Prince Haakon of Norway and many other personalities.

Sail Training journeys are performed, as well as tourist cruises.

In 1996 a coin of 1000 leva denomination that featured the ship on its tail was issued.

== Additional specifications ==
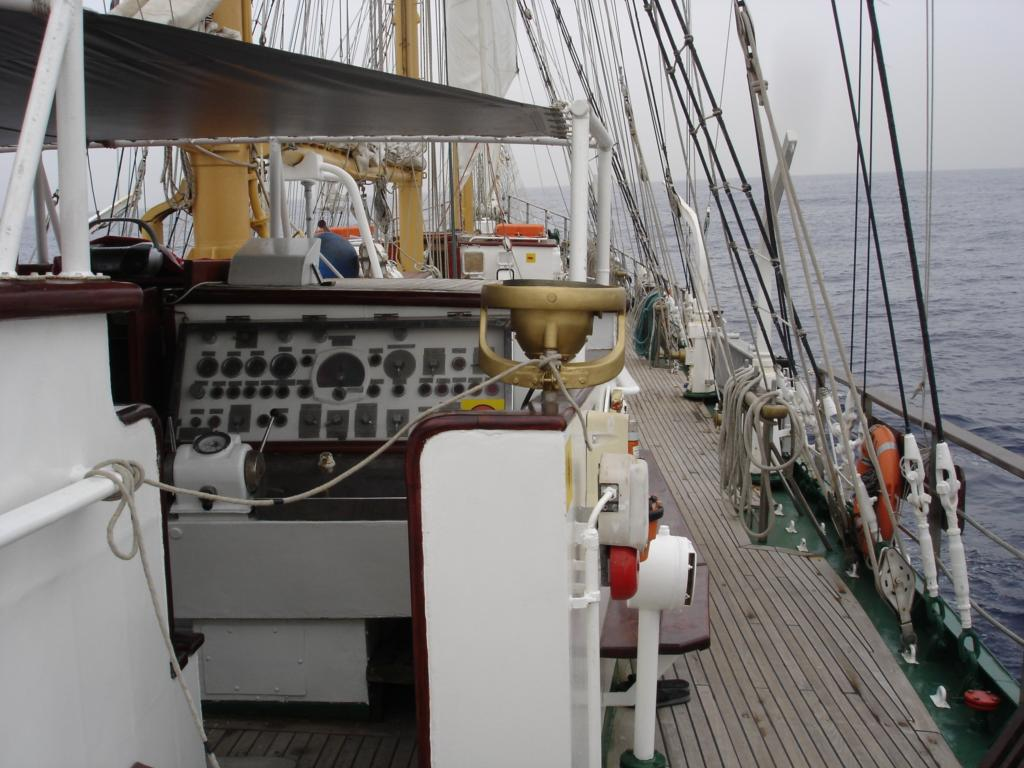
In the Mediterranean

The hull and the superstructure are made of steel; the masts are partly made of steel and partly of fabric.

Area of main sails: 816 m^{2}
Area of square sails: 264 m^{2}
Total area of the sails: 1080 m^{2}
Main and foremast height: 30.6 m
Mizzen-mast: 26.6 m
Fresh water capacity: 36 t metric
Diesel capacity: 27 t metric
Accommodation: 4 cabins with 2 hammocks each, 1 cabin with 6 hammocks, 1 cabin with 9 hammocks and 1 cabin with 11 hammocks for trainees.

== Races and awards ==
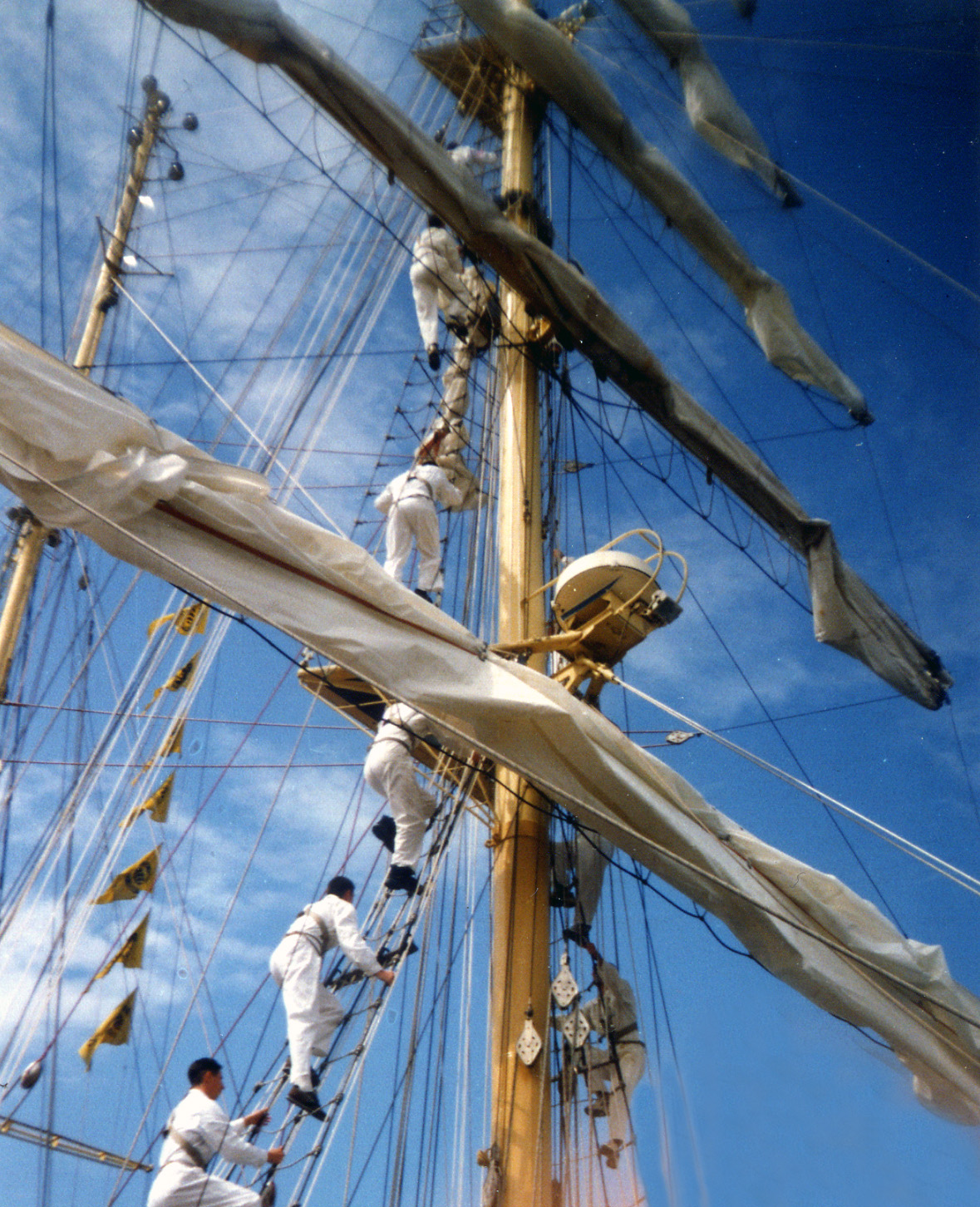
During a journey

- 1986 Cutty Sark Tall Ships Race Ranked first in both competition races and third in corrected time
- 1987 Cutty Sark '87 – Baltic Race
- 1988 Cutty Sark '88 – Baltic Race
- 1989 Sail Training Association of The Netherlands (STAN)
- 1990 Cutty Sark Training Ships Race '90
- 1992 Grand Regatta Columbus '92
- 1996 Cutty Sark '96 Mediterranean Race Won the silver cup and plaque for 1st position in Class A
- 1997 Cutty Sark '97
- 1998 Cutty Sark '98 Tall Ships Races Loyalty Prize
- 2000 Tall Ships '00 Won the first race leg from Genova to Cadiz
- 2001 Cutty Sark Tall Ships Race '01 Peter and Simon Crouter Memorial Trophy
- 2002 Cutty Sark Tall Ships '02 The Greville Howard Memorial Shield
- 2005 The Tall Ships Races '05
- 2006 The 50th Anniversary Tall Ships Races '06
- 2007 The Tall Ships' Races Mediterranean '07
- 2008 The Tall Ships' Races '08 Loyalty Prize Funchal 500 Tall Ships Regata and Festival – Communication and Security Prize
- 2009 The Tall Ship Races '09 – Baltic, Gdynia to Klaipėda
- 2010 Tall Ship Races Garibaldi '10 Communication Prize
- 2010 Tall Ship Historical Seas '10 Third place

== See also ==
- Cape Kaliakra
- Kaliakra Glacier
