= Marques (bark) =

British ship

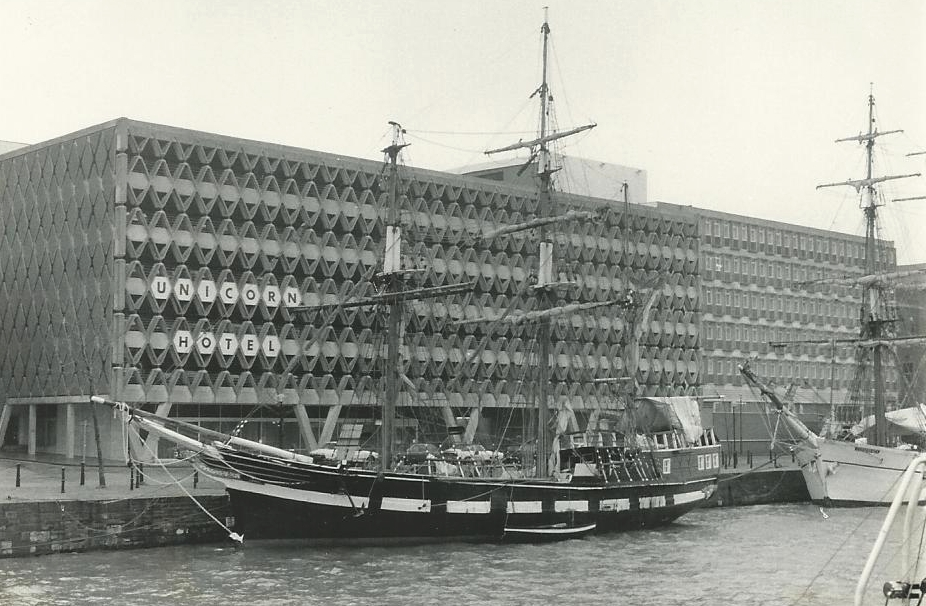

History

Spain
- Name: Marques
- Completed: 1917
- In service: 1917-?, 1947-1971
- Reclassified: Barquentine
- Fate: Sold to Robin Cecil-Wright in 1971

United Kingdom
- Acquired: By Robin Cecil-Wright in 1971
- Renamed: Marques
- Fate: Lost during Tall Ship Races on 3 June 1984

General characteristics
- Type: Built as a polacca-rigged brig, re-rigged as a barque in 1977
- Displacement: 300 tons
- Length: 120 ft (37 m)
- Beam: 24.7 ft (7.5 m)
- Complement: 28

Marques was a British-registered barque that sank during the Tall Ships' Races in 1984.

The Marques was built in Valencia, Spain, in 1917, as a polacca-rigged brig. She was used to carry fruit from the Canary Islands to northern Europe. Damaged during World War II, she was repaired in 1947 and subsequently used in the Mediterranean. She was badly maintained and, by 1971, she was in poor condition.

In 1971, Englishman Robin Cecil-Wright bought the Marques and had her extensively repaired and re-rigged in Southampton, England. She saw use in films, most notably Dracula, and in television shows such as The Onedin Line and Poldark. In 1977, Mark Litchfield bought a one-half share in the ship. She was again re-rigged, this time as a barque, largely so that she could play a part in the BBC series The Voyage of Charles Darwin, in which she doubled for Darwin's ship, HMS Beagle. At that time she was renamed the Bark Marques.

== Last voyage ==
In 1983, the Marques sailed from Plymouth, England, to Antigua in the Caribbean for use in charter tours during the northern winter. In the summer of 1984, she sailed to San Juan, Puerto Rico, to compete in the Cutty Sark Tall Ships' Races.

The Marques won the first tall ships' race, from Puerto Rico to Bermuda. On 2 June 1984, the ship left Hamilton on the second race, bound for Halifax, Nova Scotia. On the night of 2 June, the ship ran into a gale. In the early hours of 3 June, she was hit by a sudden squall and a large wave, possibly a rogue wave, and was knocked down onto her starboard side. Although the ship had been converted to a sail training and charter cruise ship, she had retained the main cargo hatch from her days as a commercial vessel. When she was knocked down, the main hatch was breached and water flooded into the interior of the ship. The vessel sank in less than a minute, with the loss of 19 of her 28 crew members.

Based on documentation of the ship, tallship sailor Daniel Parrott suggested that insufficient stability (resistance of a ship to capsizing) could have added to or caused the knock-down. Over the years, the rigging of the Marques had been changed and the sail surface probably increased, which inevitably decreased the vessel's stability, although it was not necessarily dangerous. The previous owner had repeatedly avoided a routine safety check of the ship that had been requested by British authorities. Therefore, it is unclear if the ship's stability was problematic and, if so, whether the check would have detected it.

== Sources ==
- Parrott, Daniel. Tall Ships Down: The Last Voyages of the Pamir, Albatross, Marques, Pride of Baltimore and the Maria Asumpta. McGraw Hill, 2003. ISBN 0-07-143545-X.
- Mystic Seaport Website: History of the bark Marques
- Seadercraft.com Article: Monster Ocean Waves (about the sinking)
- Stengel, Richard & Stevenson, Kevin (June 18, 1984). "It Meant to Kill Us". Time.
- Scale Reproductions: Marques - Barque-Rigged Sail-Training Ship (history and sinking)
- Freaque Waves Blog: The Brigantine Marques (about the sinking)
