= Pelican of London =

Ship built in 1948

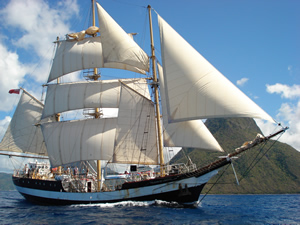
- TS Pelican at sail in 2010

History

Norway
- Name: Pelican
- Builder: Chantiers et Ateliers Augustin Normand, Le Havre, France
- Launched: 1948
- Fate: Arctic fishing trawler
- Name: Kadett
- Acquired: 1968
- Fate: Reclassed as a coastal trading vessel

History

United Kingdom
- Name: Pelican of London
- Acquired: 1995
- In service: 2007
- Identification: IMO number: 5273339; MMSI number: 235057366
- Status: In use
- Notes: Rebuilt as sail training ship, 1995–2007

General characteristics
- Tonnage: 226 GRT
- Length: 45.0 M (148 ft.) LE; 34.6 M (114 ft.) LOA hull
- Beam: 7.03 M (23 ft.)
- Draught: 3.95 M (13.0 ft.) (aft)
- Propulsion: Volvo Penta TAMD 120A-CC 290HP. Reconditioned 2000. Load Test 310 HP 2004.
- Sail plan: Main mast barquentine

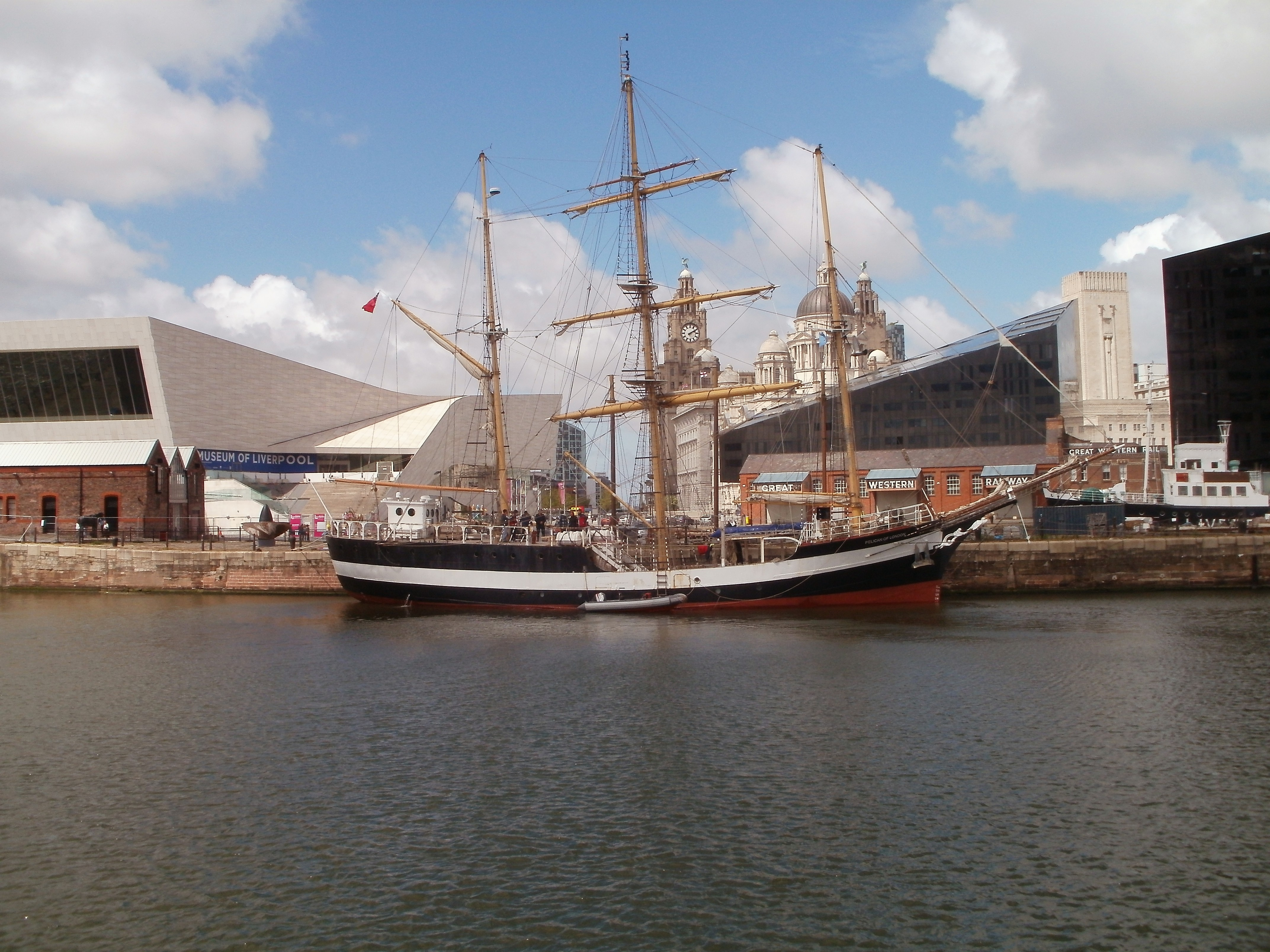
Pelican at Liverpool, 2013

Pelican of London is a sail training ship based in the United Kingdom. Built in 1948 as Pelican she served as an Arctic trawler and then a coastal trading vessel named Kadett until 1995. In 2007 an extended conversion to a sail-training ship was completed.

== History ==
Built in 1948 in Le Havre, France, Pelican was originally a double-beam Arctic fishing trawler, one of five identical ships built in Chantiers et Ateliers Augustin Normand, the shipyard founded by the Normand family. She was sold to a Norwegian firm and spent the next 19 years fishing the Arctic.

In 1968 Pelican was converted from a trawler to a coaster. Her owners renamed her Kadett. She remained Kadett for 27 years until in 1995 she again changed hands.

She was bought by ex-Naval Commander Graham Neilson who transformed her into a tall ship and renamed her Pelican of London. He had already undertaken a similar project with the TS Astrid. Working in Portland Harbour, Dorset, UK, Neilson and his team spent 12 years stripping back the trawler and rebuilding her as a main mast barquentine. A moderate rearrangement of the mainmast standing rigging enables the yards to be braced to half the traditional angle when on the wind, giving the ship unusual windward ability for a square rigger. A trainee on the ship won the 2010 Torbay cup.

As of 2012, Pelican of London was operated as a sail training vessel for young people, by the charity Adventure Under Sail. Sail Training International ranks it is a Class A tall ship. In autumn of 2012, Pelican of London was scheduled to become the first sailing ship in a century to make a trans-Atlantic voyage from the Port of Liverpool with fare-paying passengers. It's not clear if this voyage took place. Pelican has completed a number of transatlantic voyages.

Pelican of London was advertised for sale in 2012, valued at £2.45 million.

In June 2015 it was noted as an attendee of Tall Ships Belfast 2015.

From 2018 to 2024 TS Pelican of London sailed from Europe to the Caribbean and back in cooperation with the German project Ocean College during the winter months (October–April). During the summer she operated around the UK, working with various partners to provide sail training to young and disadvantaged people. Partners include Sail Training Ireland, Gordonstone International Summer School and the Sea Cadets.

In 2021 the ship embarked upon a thirteen-week research cruise organised by charity City to Sea and environmental research group Darwin200 to survey the extent of plastic pollution in UK coastal waters.
