= Chilean barquentine Esmeralda =

Sail training ship of the Chilean Navy

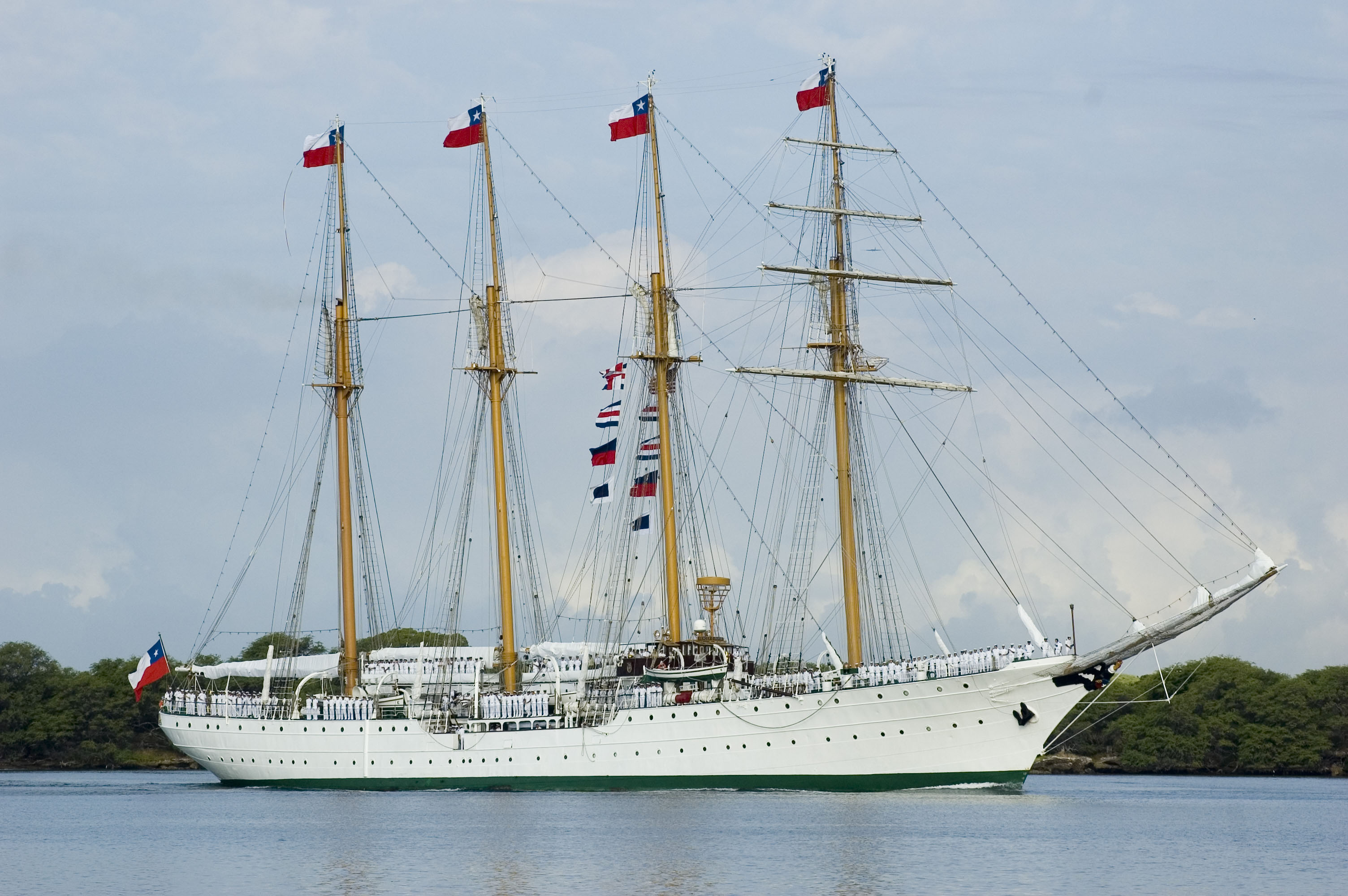
- Esmeralda in Pearl Harbor, 2006

History

Chile
- Name: Esmeralda
- Namesake: Esmeralda (The Hunchback of Notre-Dame)
- Operator: Chilean Navy
- Laid down: 1946
- Launched: May 12, 1953
- Identification: IMO number: 8642799; MMSI number: 725019006; Callsign: CCES
- Nickname(s): La Dama Blanca (The White Lady),Agnès
- Status: In active service

General characteristics
- Class & type: Juan Sebastian Elcano-class training ship
- Displacement: 3754 tons
- Length: 113 m (371 ft)
- Beam: 13.11 m (43.0 ft)
- Height: 48.5 m (159 ft)
- Draft: 7 m (23 ft)
- Sail plan: four-masted barquentine; 21 sails, total sail area of 2,870 m² (30,892 sq. ft.)
- Speed: max 13 knots engine, 17.5 knots sail
- Complement: 300 sailors, 90 midshipmen
- Armament: 4 × 57 mm ceremonial gun mounts

Esmeralda is a steel-hulled four-masted barquentine of the Chilean Navy.

== Construction ==
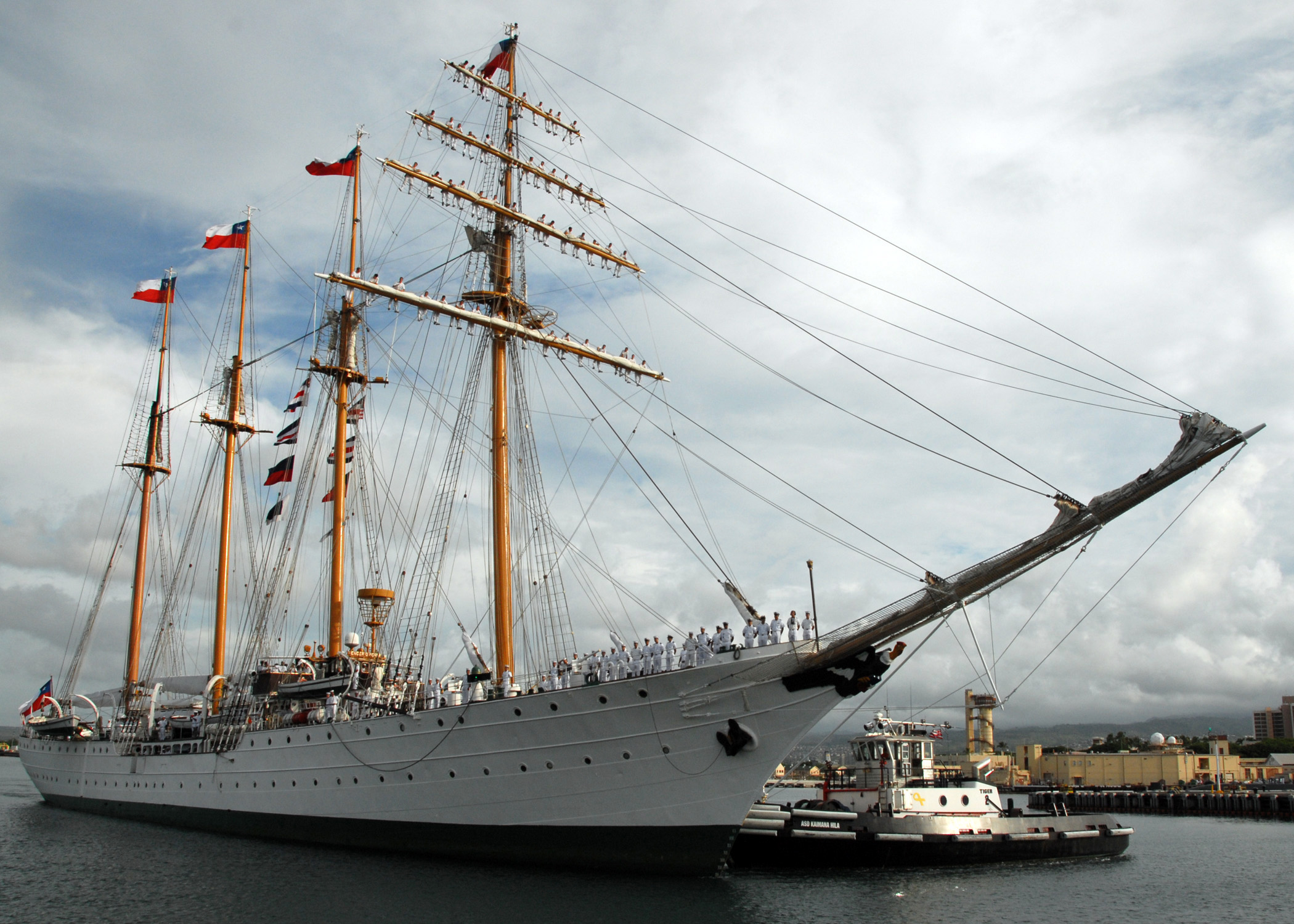
Esmeralda in 2007

The ship is the sixth to carry the name Esmeralda. The first was the frigate Esmeralda captured from the Spanish at Callao, Peru, by Admiral Lord Thomas Cochrane of the Chilean Navy, in a bold incursion on the night of 5 November 1820. The second was the corvette Esmeralda of the Chilean Navy, which, set against superior forces, fought until sunk with colors flying on 21 May 1879 at the Battle of Iquique. These events are considered significant milestones by the Chilean navy.

Construction began in Cádiz, Spain, in 1946. She was intended to become Spain's national training ship. During her construction in 1947 the yard in which she was being built suffered catastrophic explosions, which damaged the ship and placed the yard on the brink of bankruptcy. Work on the ship was temporarily halted. In 1950 Chile and Spain entered into negotiations in which Spain offered to repay debts incurred to Chile as a result of the Spanish Civil War in the form of manufactured products, including the not yet completed Esmeralda. Chile accepted the offer, and the ship was formally transferred to the ownership of Chile in 1951. Work then continued on the ship. She was finally launched on 12 May 1953 before an audience of 5,000 people. She was christened by Mrs. Raquel Vicuña de Orrego using a bottle wrapped in the national colors of Spain and Chile. She was delivered as a four-masted topsail schooner to the Government of Chile on 15 June 1954, Captain Horacio Cornejo Tagle in command.

Her sister ship is the training ship for the Spanish Navy, the four-masted topsail schooner Juan Sebastián de Elcano. Sometime in the 1970s, Esmeralda's rigging was changed to a four-masted barquentine by replacing the fore gaffsail by two main staysails. The third (top) main staysail is still in place. She has now five staysails, three gaff topsails, six jibs, three gaff sails, four square sails, 21 all in all.

== Voyages ==
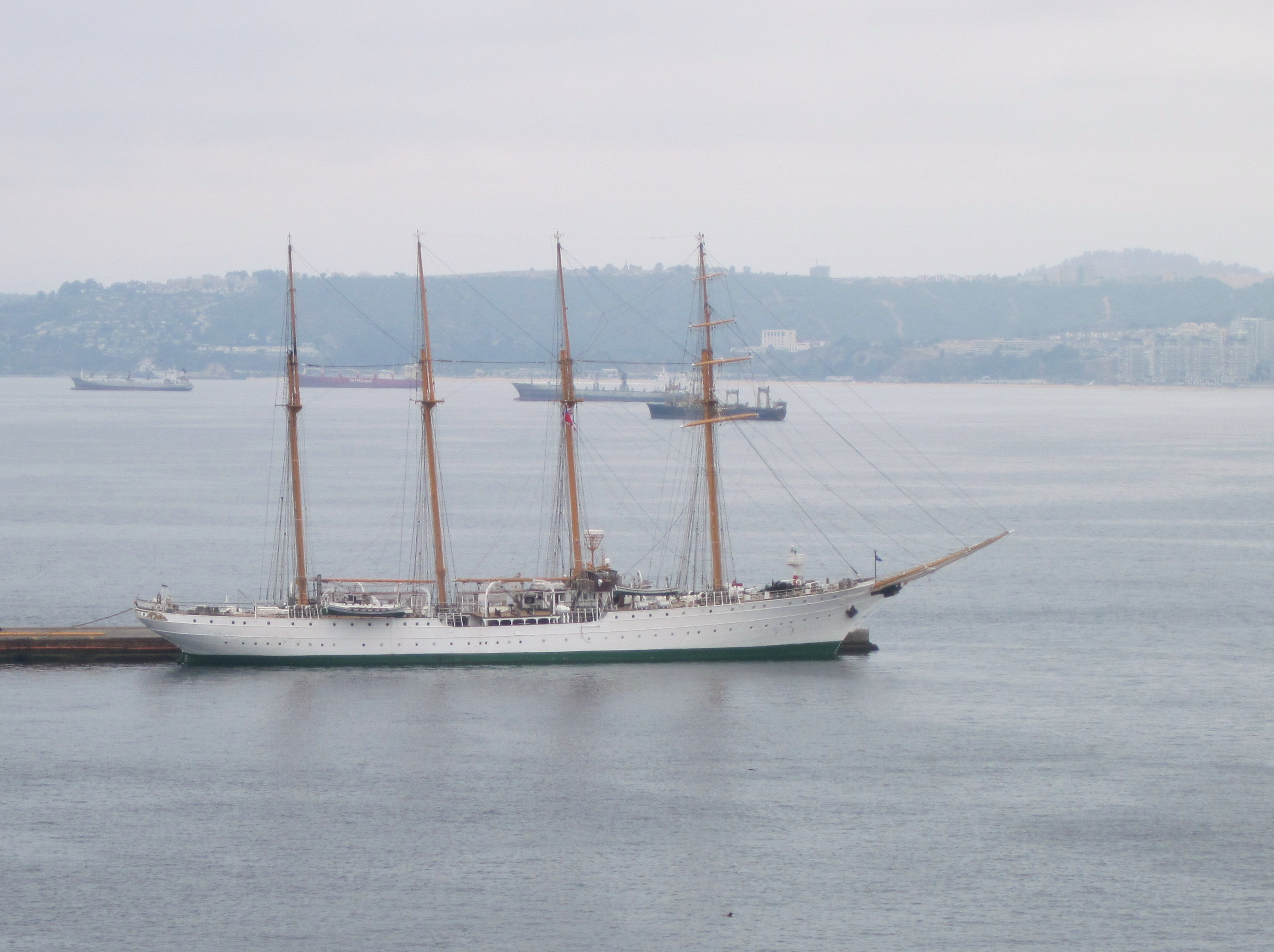
Esmeralda at Valparaíso in 2012

Her first voyage was to the Canary Islands and then on to New Orleans, where a distillation plant was installed. She then proceeded through the Panama Canal and arrived at Valparaíso on 1 September 1954 to much fanfare.

Since her commissioning, Esmeralda has been a training ship for the Chilean Navy. She has visited more than 300 ports worldwide, acting as a floating embassy for Chile. She participated in Operation Sail at New York City in 1964, 1976 and 1986, and the Osaka World Sail in 1983. She also participated in International Regattas of Sail in 1964, 1976, 1982 and 1990 winning the Cutty Sark Trophy in the last two participations.

In 2015, Esmeralda visited the Netherlands as part of SAIL Amsterdam, attracting protestors. She had previously visited the Netherlands in 1965 and 1968.

In 2016, Esmeralda visited New Zealand to participate in the 75th Anniversary Celebrations of the foundation of the Royal New Zealand Navy.

In 2019, Esmeralda visited Singapore in light of the APEC Chile 2019.

In 2026, Esmeralda took part in Sail 250.

== Prison and torture centre ==
Reports from Amnesty International, the US Senate and Chilean Truth and Reconciliation Commission describe the ship as a kind of floating jail and torture chamber for political prisoners of the Augusto Pinochet regime during 1973. It is claimed that probably over a hundred persons were kept there at times and subjected to hideous treatment, among them Michael Woodward, a British MAPU activist and former priest, who later died as a result of torture.

Due to this dark part of its history, the international voyages of the Esmeralda are often highly controversial - especially at the time when Pinochet was still in power but even after the restoration of Chilean democracy. The ship's arrival in various ports is accompanied by protests and demonstrations by local political groups and Chilean left-wing political exiles. Such protest actions were recorded, among other places, at Amsterdam, Dartmouth, Quebec, Vancouver and Victoria, British Columbia, Sydney, Wellington, Piraeus and Haifa, as well as at Santiago in Chile itself.

The Dark Side of the White Lady (El lado obscuro de la dama blanca), a documentary film by Chilean-Canadian filmmaker Patricio Henríquez, portrays this history.

== General characteristics ==
- Length: 109.8 metres
- Beam: 13.11 metres
- Maximum draught: 7 metres
- Stanchion: 8.7 metres
- Gunwale height: 5.3 metres
- Maximum displacement: 3,754 tons
- Maximum engine speed: 13 knots
- Maximum sail speed: 17.5 knots
- Armament: 4 × 57 mm ceremonial gun mounts
- Crew: 300 sailors, 90 midshipmen
- Sails: 29 total with a sail area of 2,870 m², on four masts
- Mast height: 48.5 metres

== See also ==
- Esmeralda (1884)
- List of large sailing vessels
