= Chilean ship Esmeralda =

Several ships of the Chilean Navy have been named Esmeralda

- Spanish frigate Esmeralda, a Spanish frigate that Chile captured in 1820 and renamed Valdivia; she was wrecked in 1825
- Chilean corvette Esmeralda, a wooden steam corvette sunk during the War of the Pacific
- Chilean cruiser Esmeralda (1883), the world's first protected cruiser; purchased by Japan in 1894 and renamed Izumi
- Chilean cruiser Esmeralda (1896), an armored cruiser
- Chilean frigate Esmeralda, ex-HMCS Glace Bay (K414)
- Chilean barquentine Esmeralda, a training ship of the Chilean Navy, launched in 1953
