= Tall Ship Atyla =

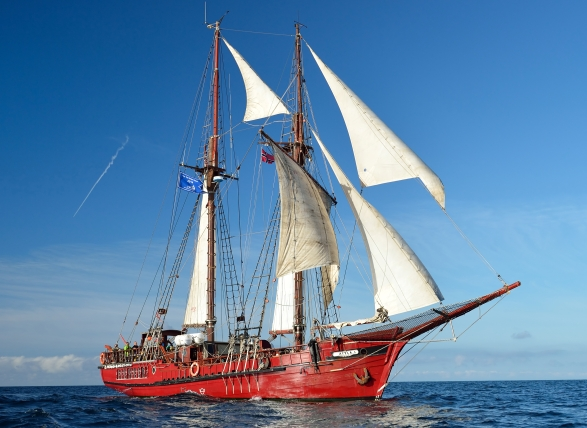
- Atyla during the Tall Ships Races 2014

History

Spain
- Name: Atyla
- Owner: Esteban Vicente
- Operator: Marea Errota SLU (De la Serna Vicente family)
- Port of registry: Amsterdam, the Netherlands
- Route: As sail training vessel, all around the Mediterranean and the Atlantic
- Builder: Handmade by Vicente Esteban, Soria
- Launched: 15 May 1984
- Status: In service

General characteristics
- Class & type: Tall ship class B
- Displacement: 100.99 m^{3} (3,566 cu ft)
- Length: 31.28 m (102.6 ft)
- Beam: 7 m (23 ft)
- Height: 25 m (82 ft)
- Draught: 3.05 m (10.0 ft)
- Decks: 160 m^{2} (1,700 sq ft)
- Installed power: 1 x 300 bhp 8-cylinder diesel engine
- Propulsion: sail & engine
- Sail plan: Staysail Schooner
- Speed: 12.7 knots (23.5 km/h; 14.6 mph)
- Capacity: 80 people (24 people overnight)
- Crew: 5–7 permanent crew members
- Notes: Won the Friendship trophy in its 2nd tall ship regatta ever in 2014 (In the Black Sea Regatta 2014)

Tall ship Atyla (Spanish: [aˈtila]) is a two-masted wooden schooner handmade in Spain between 1980 and 1984. She was designed by Esteban Vicente Jimenez to look like the Spanish vessels from the 1800s and built with the intention of circumnavigating the Earth following the Magellan–Elcano route and then become a training ship. Although she never did that trip and instead sailed around Spain for almost her 30 years, in 2013 Esteban's nephew became her new skipper and decided to finally dedicate her to international sail training for both professionals and amateurs.

== Construction ==
Atyla was a personal project of Esteban Vicente Jimenez (Soria, 1953), sport teacher and professional canoeist. With his friends, they wanted to build a ship to sail around the world. Esteban started designing the ship from scratch in 1979 to make it look like the traditional Spanish vessels from the 1800s. The project was then tuned and corrected upon approval by the naval architect PhD. Franciso Lasa Etxarri. Most of the wooden part were carved in Vinuesa (Soria), using ash, elondo, oak and mainly, Scots pine, a tree that is highly abundant in the area. The masts were made using two 175-year-old pines donated by the town of Vinuesa itself in support of the project. The rest of the boat, including the hull, was made using an African hardwood known as iroko, which is amongst the most durable ones in the world. Some years later, in 1986, the original pine masts were replaced with iroko as well. The assembly took place in Lekeitio, in the abandoned building of the shipyard Eguiguren & Atxurra by the banks of the river Lea. Its owner Jose María Solano allowed Esteban to use it. They had to restore the boat yard a little bit, and the building still stands today as part of Lekeitio's history. In 1983 the idea of circumnavigating the world following the Magellan–Elcano route was already rounded, and a company from the region (Petronor) was going to sponsor the circumnavigation. In 1984 esteban Esteban received the Honourable Mention of the Rolex Awards for Enterprise for the project.

== Launching ==
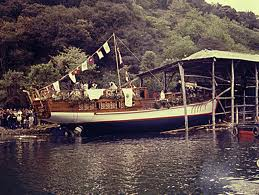
Launching in Lekeitio (Spain) in 1984

Atyla was launched on May 15, 1984. On the following weeks the engine and the electronic systems where installed in the shipyard Celaya. This shipyard of the city of Erandio (between Bilbao and Getxo) was famous because of the huge sailing boats that were built there until its closing at the end of the 1980s. Everything was ready when suddenly Petronor cancelled the sponsorship and Esteban was forced to find a new plan to fund the schooner's journey.

== Time spent in Spain ==
In 1986 the plan was to go to the Caribbean to do short sailing trips with tourists. Nevertheless, the plans were once again cut short en route to the Canary Islands to cross the Atlantic Ocean, when a storm forced the crew to shelter in Tangier and the boat got completely looted. Without provisions or equipment, the crew sailed the Atyla to the island of Lanzarote to recover from the robbery and there they started doing day-trips of sailing for families. Atyla remained nineteen years in the Port of Playa Blanca (south of Lanzarote). In 2005 the government of Cantabria (North Spain) hired Atyla to represent the region. She was brought to Santander, where for six years she was used for different kinds of activities related to tourism and environmental projects. Once the contract with the government of Cantabria was finished Esteban's nephew Rodrigo de la Serna (born in Madrid in 1989) decided to take charge of Atyla in order to keep her sailing. Esteban and Rodrigo worked together carving a new bowsprit and both the gaff and boom of the foresail and then they moved the vessel to the Mediterranean Sea where she was chartered for a big sailing event by the brand Cutty Sark commencing in Ibiza.

== International Sail Training ==
In September 2013 Atyla took part on the Mediterranean Tall Ships Regatta 2013, organized by Sail Training International. Rodrigo saw in these kind of events his opportunity to finally dedicate the vessel to sail training and to develop an educational project around it. In 2014 Atyla's route was called "Full sail around Europe" and it consisted on navigating 20,000 kilometres (equivalent to half the Earth's circumference) without leaving the European continent.

The ship is currently in the process of registering under the British Flag

== See also ==
- List of large sailing vessels
