= Santa Maria Manuela =

Portuguese four-masted schooner built in 1937

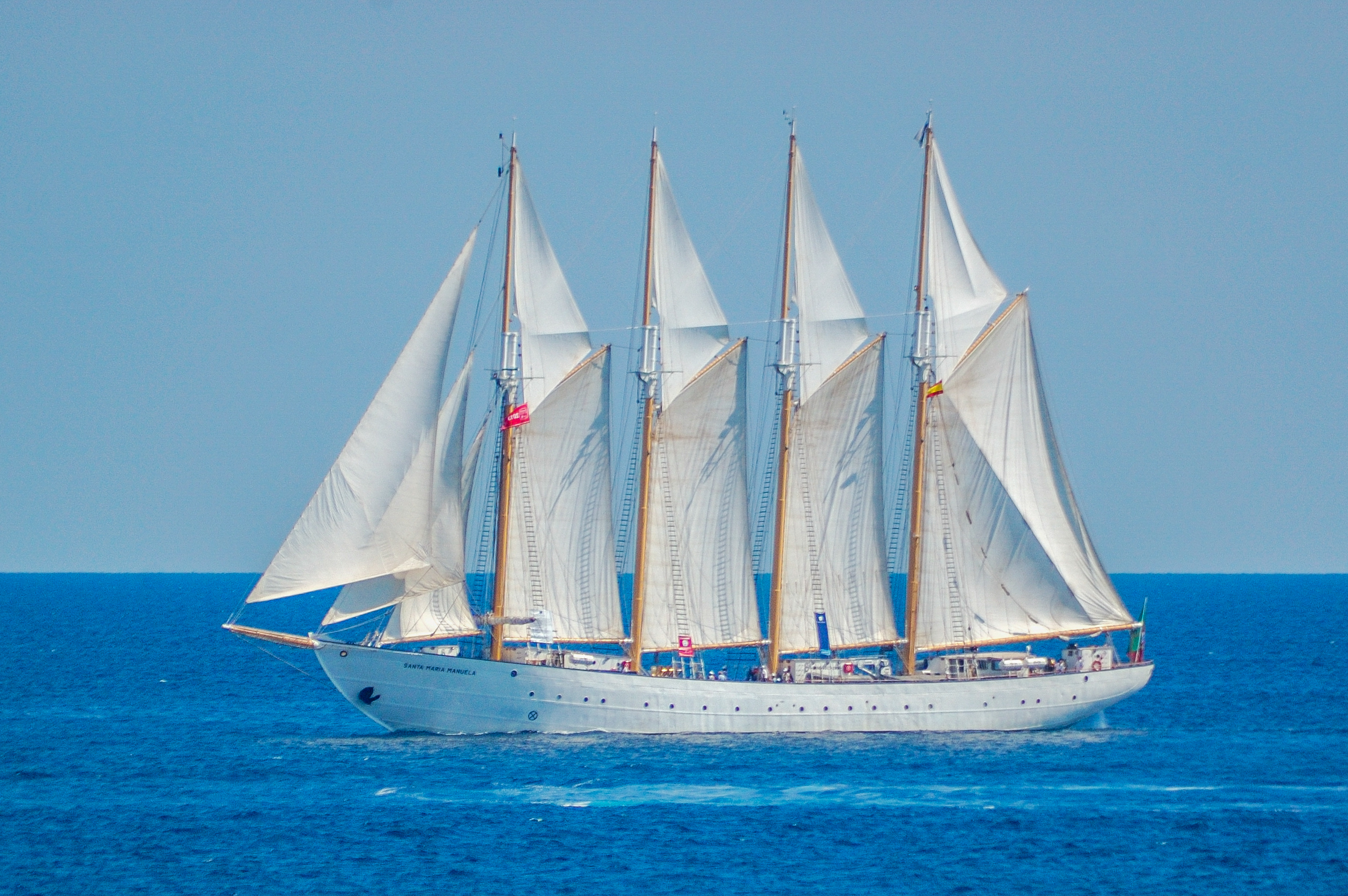
- Santa Maria Manuela with full sail

History

Portugal
- Name: Santa Maria Manuela
- Builder: CUF Shipyards, Lisbon
- Launched: 1937
- Home port: Aveiro
- Identification: IMO number: 5312628; MMSI number: 255806006; Callsign: CSKO
- Status: Training ship

General characteristics
- Type: Schooner
- Displacement: 894 long tons (908 t) light; 1,300 long tons (1,321 t)
- Length: 67.4 m (221 ft 2 in) o/a; 52.8 m (173 ft 3 in) p/p
- Beam: 9.9 m (32 ft 6 in)
- Height: of masts, 36 m (118 ft 1 in)
- Draft: 5.94 m (19 ft 6 in)
- Propulsion: Sails / MTU 8-cylinder engine, 500 cv

Santa Maria Manuela is a Portuguese four-masted schooner. Originally a codfish fishing ship, Santa Maria Manuela is now used for sail training, hands on sailing holidays, environmental expeditions and team development programs. It belongs to Grupo Jerónimo Martins and is the sistership of the Portuguese Navy's Creoula.

== History ==
Santa Maria Manuela was built in the CUF shipyards at Lisbon in 1937, as a lugre bacalhoeiro (codfish fishing lugger). The similar Creoula was built in the same shipyards at the same time. Another similar and still existent ship, Argus was built in 1938 by the shipyard De Haan & Oerlemans, Heusden, Holland.

Since its building and until the late 1980s, Santa Maria Manuela was employed in the codfish fishing in the seas of Newfoundland and Greenland, being one of the ships of the White Fleet (as the Portuguese fishing fleet was known in Newfoundland, because of the white color of most of their ships).

The ship was owned by Empresa de Pesca de Viana fishing company, until 1963, when it was sold to Empresa de Pesca Ribau. During the 1960s, Santa Maria Manuela underwent several modifications and technological improvements in order to be able to continue in fishing activity. Finally in 1993, definitely been considered obsolete, the ship was partially demolished, only her hull being preserved.

In 2007, Pascoal S.A. bought the remainings of the ship and started a long and well documented restoration process in the Aveiro shipyards, returning it to its original state in 2010.

She took part in the Fete-Maritime-de-Brest-2016 (Tall ships Race) on 19 July 2016.

== Sea training and cruise ship ==
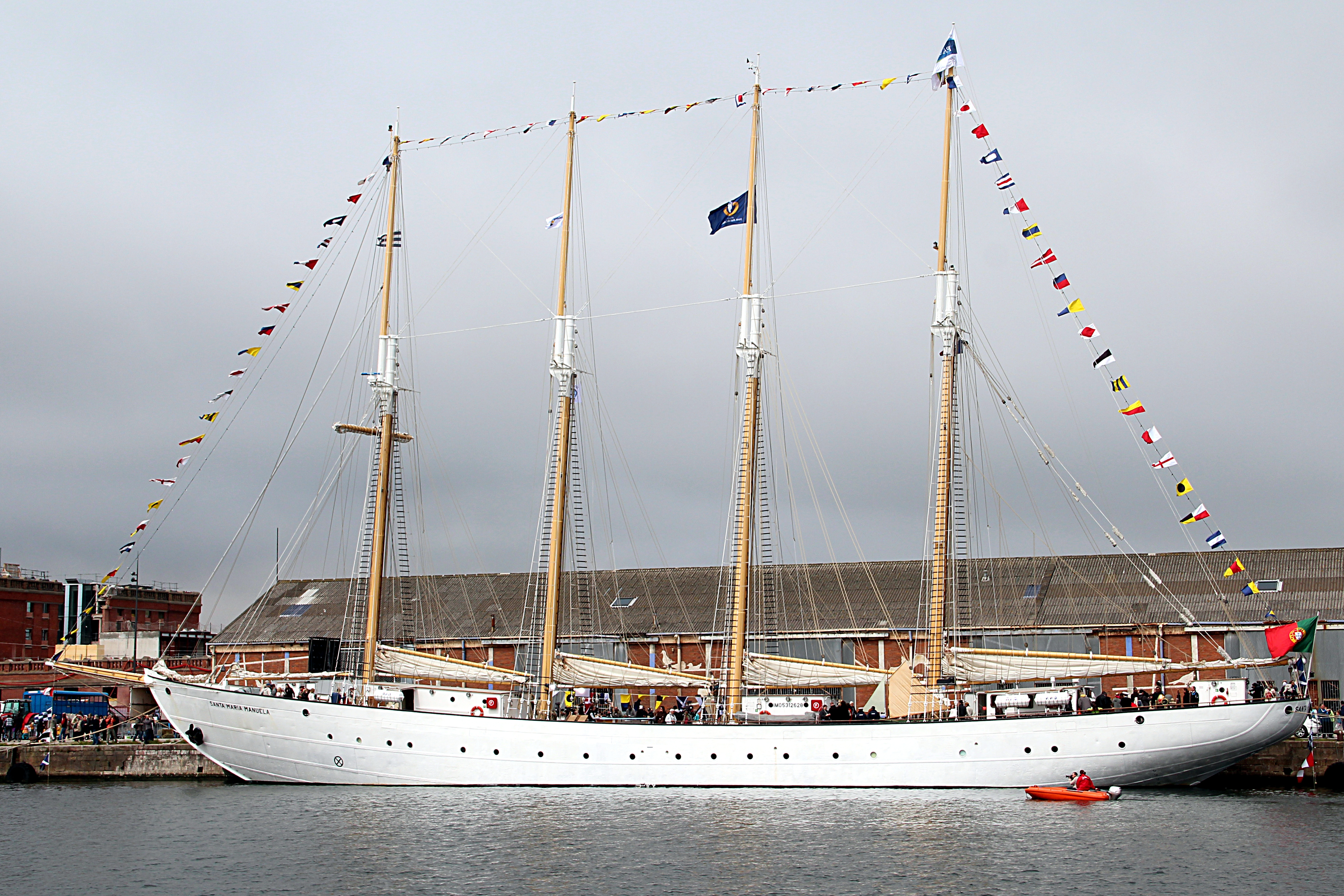
Santa Maria Manuela visiting Dunkirk, France

Sail training and adventure sailing voyages are offered for up to 44 paying guests.
