= La Grace =

Replica sailing ship

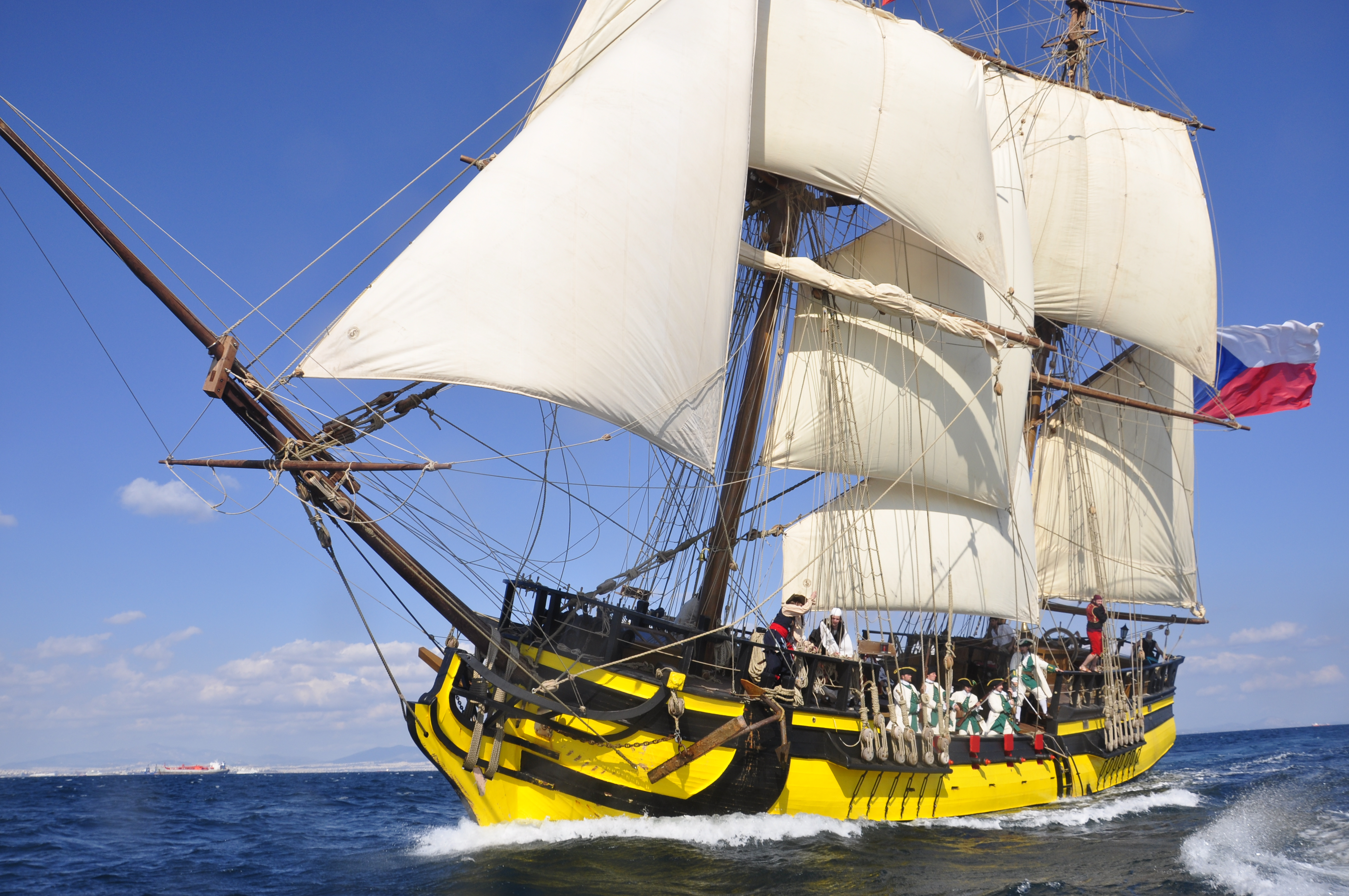
- La Grace near Athens, Greece

History

Czech Republic
- Name: La Grace (replica)
- Operator: LaGrace Inc.
- Laid down: 2008
- Launched: 5 December 2010
- Home port: Prague, Czech Republic
- Identification: MMSI number: 270467000; Callsign: OL5614
- Status: Active

General characteristics
- Class & type: Brig
- Tons burthen: 126 tons
- Length: 23.8 m (78.1 ft) (LBP), 32.6 m (107 ft) Overall
- Height: 25 m (82.0 ft) (waterline to top of Rig height)
- Draft: 2.8 m (9.2 ft)
- Propulsion: Sails, diesel engine MAN D 2866 TE 375 hp (279,637.5 W)
- Sail plan: Brig; 364 m^{2} (3,918.1 sq ft)

La Grace is a replica of a brig from the 18th century. The original ship of Augustine Herman (Augustin Heřman in Czech) bore this name (which roughly translates as “Graceful”) during merchant and exploratory travels around Europe, United States, Caribbean and across the Atlantic Ocean. La Grace was also renowned for her corsair activities. Especially well-known is her victory over two Spanish barques carrying sugar, tobacco and wine near the coast of Guatemala. This modern replica is utilised solely to teach the art of old-time seamanship. Her crew is mainly from the Czech Republic.

== Construction ==
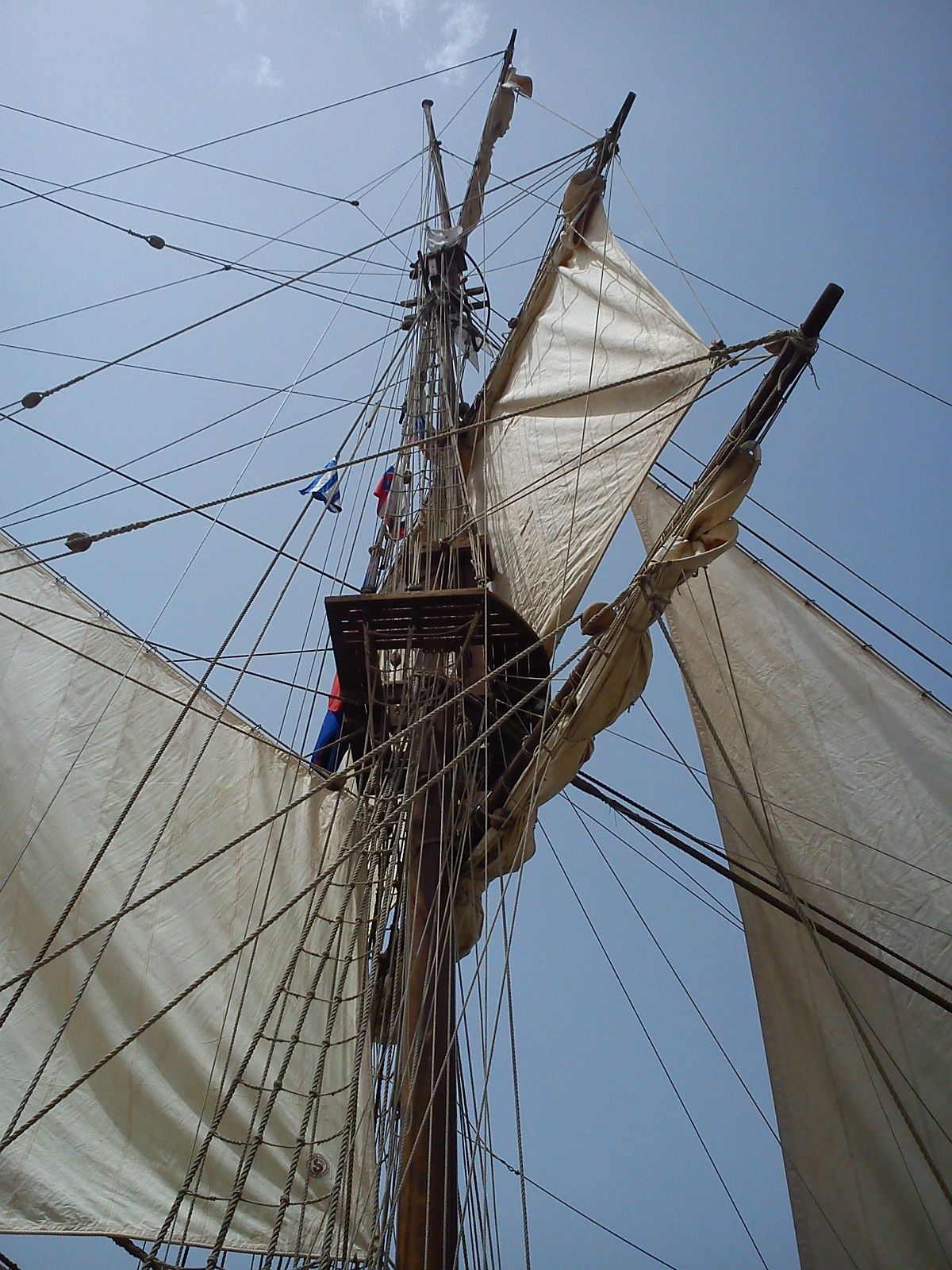
Fore-mast and rigging

The construction of the vessel had started at the end of 2008 in a commercial shipyard at Suez, Egypt, under supervision of vessel's captain Josef Dvorský and ship constructor Daniel Rosecký (who are now co-owners). The main reason why Suez was selected for a construction site was utilization of traditional ship building procedures, which are still prevalent there. A wooden model had to be made first for the Egyptian builders, as was usual in the 18th century. The boat was then constructed according to this maquette. Due to the importance of the Suez Canal in global trade, high quality Scandinavian wood is readily available in Egypt. This wood was the most usual and favourite shipbuilding material in the Age of Sail. However, the keel and the frames are made of extremely hard and sturdy camphor wood and mulberry wood. Planking and decks timbers are made of Finnish pine tree wood. But nowadays, original Chapman’s blueprints are not sufficient to build a ship. Because of that, a 3D model of the ship was also made based on these blueprints. The virtual representation was then utilised to make even more detailed plans. A large amount of calculations were necessary as well (e.g. a stability assessment). Masts, yards, blocks, as well as steering wheel and cannons were made in joiner's shop of Vilém Pavlica at Valašské Meziříčí, Czech Republic. Dozens of volunteers from all over the Czech Republic worked since June 2009 and helped to complete the equipment. In December 2009, all the material was shipped to the shipyard in Suez. The following year was mainly in the spirit of 21st century technology. Ship’s engine, electric generator, water and power distribution were installed. Most of the work was again conducted by a joint effort of both experts and volunteers. La Grace was launched on 5 December 2010, nearly two years after the construction began. In the next few weeks the ship was at anchor, receiving finishing touches and fitting out; primarily the fitting of sails and rigging supervised by Viktor Neuman, the ship's sailing master and boatswain.

== Description of La Grace ==
La Grace is an authentic replica of the brig from the second half of the 18th century. Its construction is based on blueprints published in 1768 by Swedish Admiral Fredrik Henrik af Chapman in the book Architectura navalis mercatoria. Chapman is credited as the first naval architect who laid the foundations of the modern shipbuilding while relying on precise blueprints. He introduced batch production of the ships using preconstructed segments long before Henry Ford, and thus radically shortened the construction time. Many ships, both naval and merchant ships, were constructed using his blueprints, including modern replicas of the historic sailing ships from 15th to 18th century. Although La Grace is conceived in such a way that even Admiral Nelson would not notice any unhistorical flaw or anachronism at first sight, she is equipped with a modern technology inside, safety systems and equipment necessary to allow safe navigation and agreeable living conditions for her crew.

== Giving the name La Grace ==
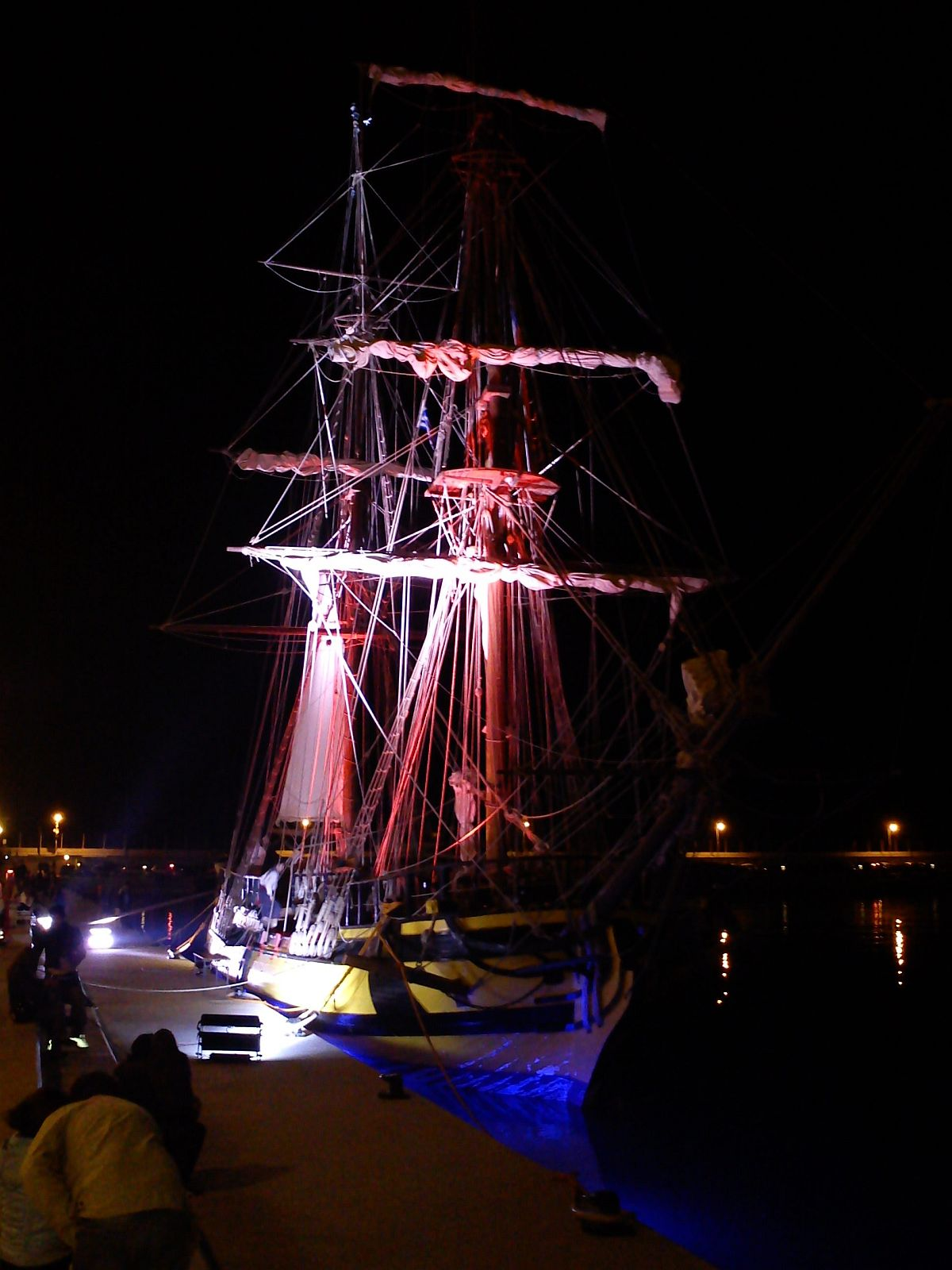
La Grace in awaiting the Baptism ceremony

La Grace has been baptised after the famous sailing ship of Augustine Herman (which was in fact a frigate) to commemorate Czech maritime history. Baptism ceremony took place on 1 May 2011 in Athens, Greece, as the apex of the four days long festivities. A bottle of Champagne was broken against the bow by Miss Czech Republic Lucie Křížková. The boat has two godmothers. Together with Mrs. Křížková it is also Eliška Tannerová from Moravia, by then an 18-month-old girl. Finale of the festivities took place on Cape Sounion, where, at sunset, the Captain of the boat threw an offering to the god of the sea Poseidon down into the water, pleading for his goodwill.

== Accommodation ==
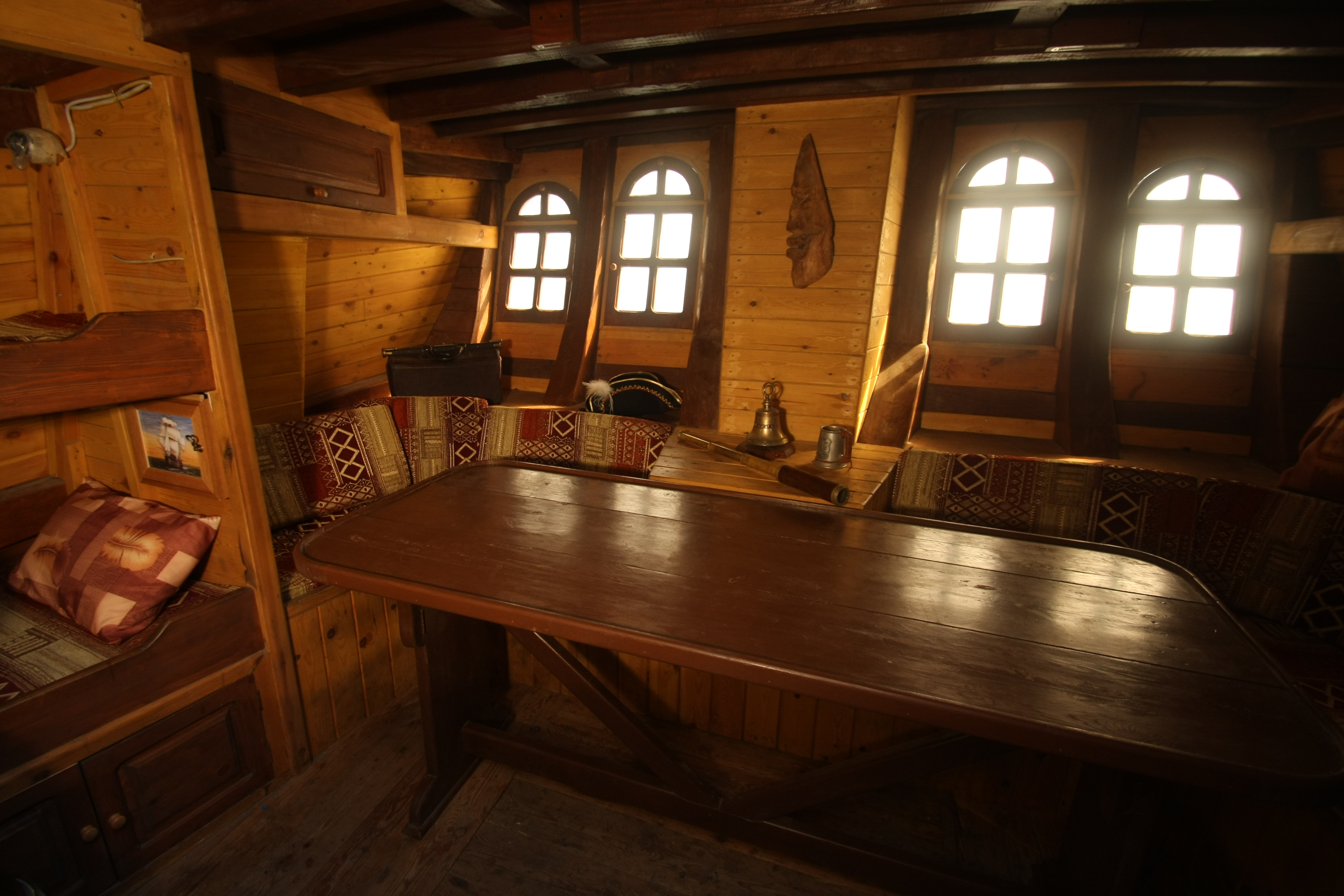
Captain's Quarters

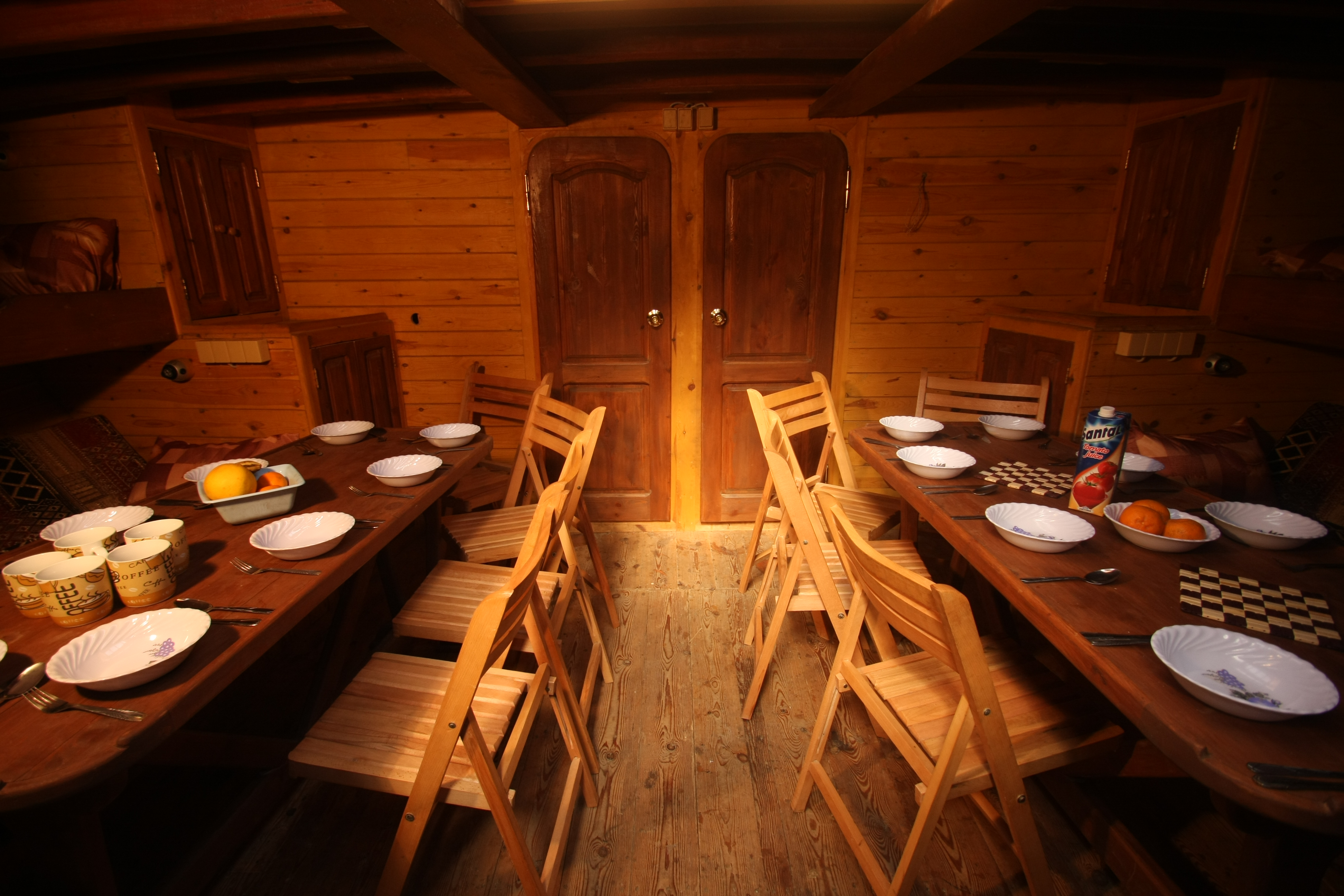
Mess Room

Interiors of La Grace
- 6 double bed cabins in the central and stern part of the vessel. There is a folding double bed and another bed over it in every cabin. Cabins are suitable for two adults or a family with one child not older than approximately 15 years of age. Every two cabins under the poop deck have a common bathroom with a toilet. Three cabins under the main deck have one common bathroom.
- 8 beds in the cabin under the forecastle and 4 beds in the dining room. There are two bathrooms for cadets under the forecastle.
- First two of the cabins under the main deck can be dismantled. This will clear another four beds for the cadets as well as double the size of the dining room. This space could then be used for various events, parties or lectures.

== First time on the high seas ==
During her first year on the high seas the boat navigated the sea between three landmasses – Africa, Europe and the Americas. In November 2011 La Grace traversed the distance from Egypt to Greece, Italy, Aeolian Islands, Corsica, Sardinia, Elba, Balearic Islands, Spain, Gibraltar and Canary Islands. At the Canaries volunteers again helped to ready her for the transatlantic crossing, painting, adjusting rigging, outfitting her under auspices of the professional crew. After the transatlantic voyage, she spent the New Year at Saint Lucia and the first months of 2012 near the Dominican Republic offering trips to tourists and adventurers alike and finally also in repairs and preparations for the second crossing of the Atlantic Ocean. On 30 April 2012 she left Dominican Republic and set sail for Azores.. Successful navigation was completed on 8 June when La Grace dropped anchor in Gibraltar. Since then it sails around Mediterranean, especially Elba and Corsica.

== 2012 grounding ==
On October 26, 2012 while sailing under Master Jiří Pacák, La Grace laid anchor close to Puerto de la Bajadilla in Marbella, Spain. After a sudden wind change, La Grace's anchor broke, and an engine failure caused it to run aground at Playa el Cable. All 8 crew members safely disembarked. The rudder was damaged during the accident and the boat laid on the shoal, tilting some 20 degrees to port, slowly leaking water. The Salvage operation was successful, the boat was re-floated on 11 November 2012 and towed to Sotogrande where the repairs commenced. Two weeks while most of the boat was under water and unshielded from waves caused substantial damage. Complete plumbing, electronics and practically all other equipment had to be changed or refurbished. All the wooden parts had to be dried, sandpapered and varnished. The engine was completely reconstructed and a new propeller was installed. The boat received a new keel, as well as a rudder and additional 12 tons of ballast. After nearly nine months in dry dock, La Grace touched the water again on Tuesday 6 August 2013 at 1:08 PM.

== Since the re-launching ==
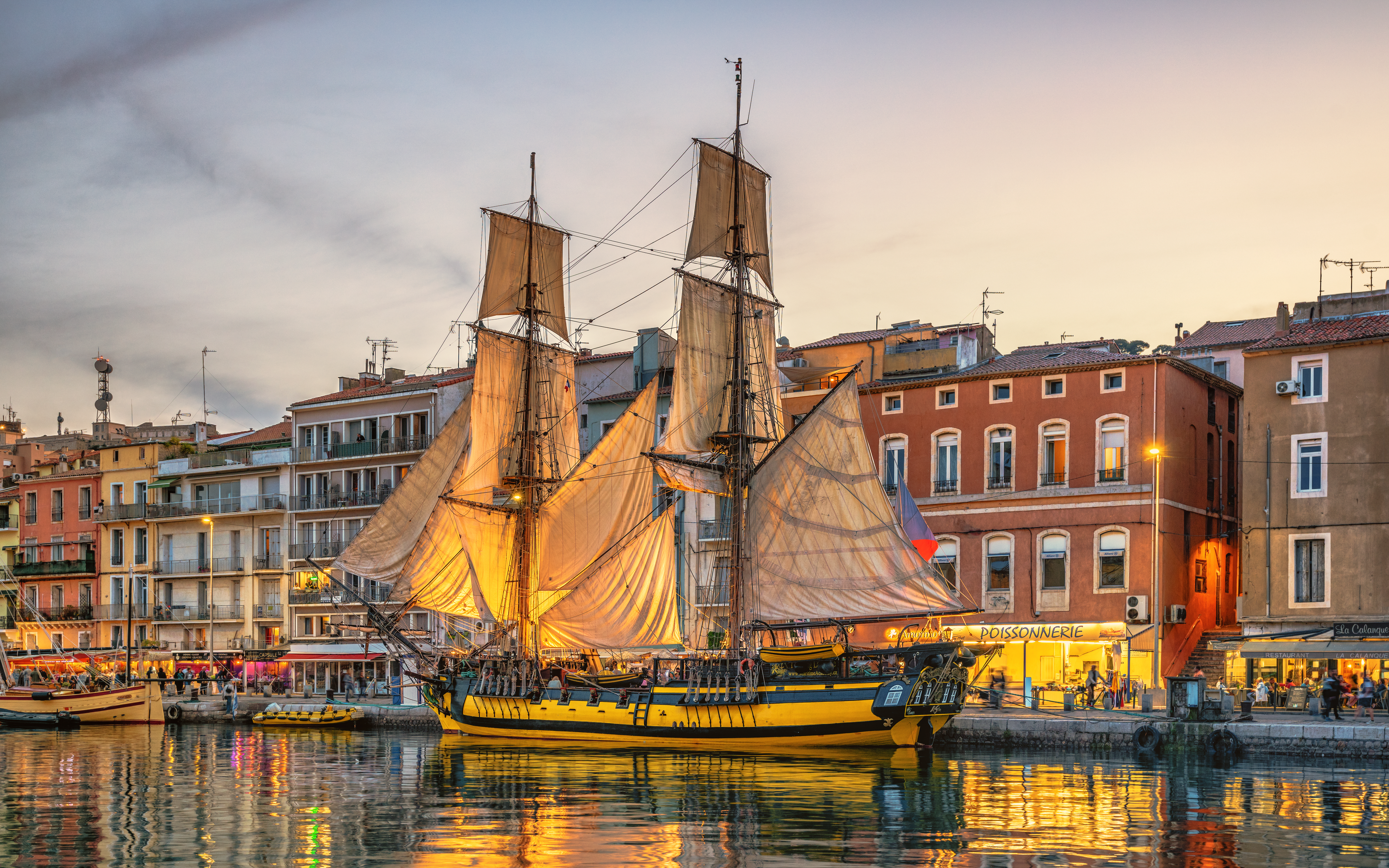
La Grace in Sète, France

After a month spent with commercial trips and preparations La Grace joined the Mediterranean Tall Ships Regatta 2013 in Barcelona. She participated in its two legs between Barcelona, Toulon and La Spezia. First race between Barcelona and Toulon from 21 to 27 September was riddled by a lack of favourable wind. La Grace finished this race after 50 hours and 47 minutes of sail, well after most other participants. However, due to handicap assigned to her by the race directorate the final time was adjusted to 23 hours and 9 minutes which placed La Grace to the third position in Category A (which includes all square – rigged vessels and all other vessel more than 40 metres Length Overall, regardless of rig.

Second race from Toulon to La Spezia taking place between 30 September and 7 October began similarly as the first one - by a lack of wind. However, as the conditions changed and the whole area was hit by a stormy weather, the previous selection of route proved to be a good one. La Grace arrived to La Spezia on Thursday 3 October at 6:17 AM. Following a day of uncertainty caused by a decision of the race directorate to end the competition prematurely due to safety reasons the crew began celebrating their victory both in Category A and in the whole Mediterranean Tall Ships Regatta 2013.
