= Joseph Augustin Normand =

French naval architect and engineer

Joseph Augustin Normand (1753–1808) was a French naval architect and engineer.
