= UAM Creoula =

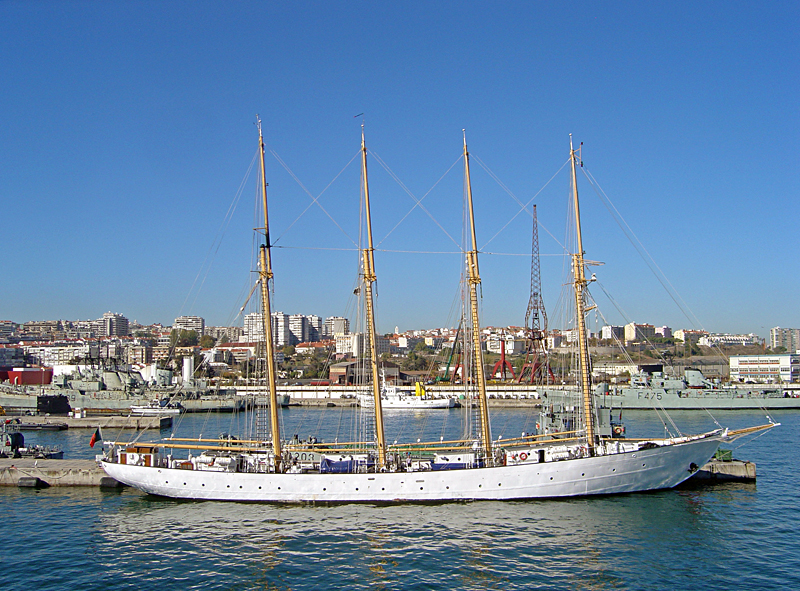
- UAM Creoula

History

Portugal
- Name: UAM Creoula
- Launched: 1937
- Identification: IMO number: 5081918; MMSI number: 263146000; Callsign: CTEL
- Status: Training ship

General characteristics
- Type: Lugger
- Displacement: 894 long tons (908 t) light; 1,300 long tons (1,321 t) full
- Length: 67.4 m (221 ft 2 in) o/a; 52.8 m (173 ft 3 in) p/p
- Beam: 9.9 m (32 ft 6 in)
- Height: of masts, 36 m (118 ft 1 in)
- Propulsion: Sails / MTU 8-cylinder engine, 500 cv

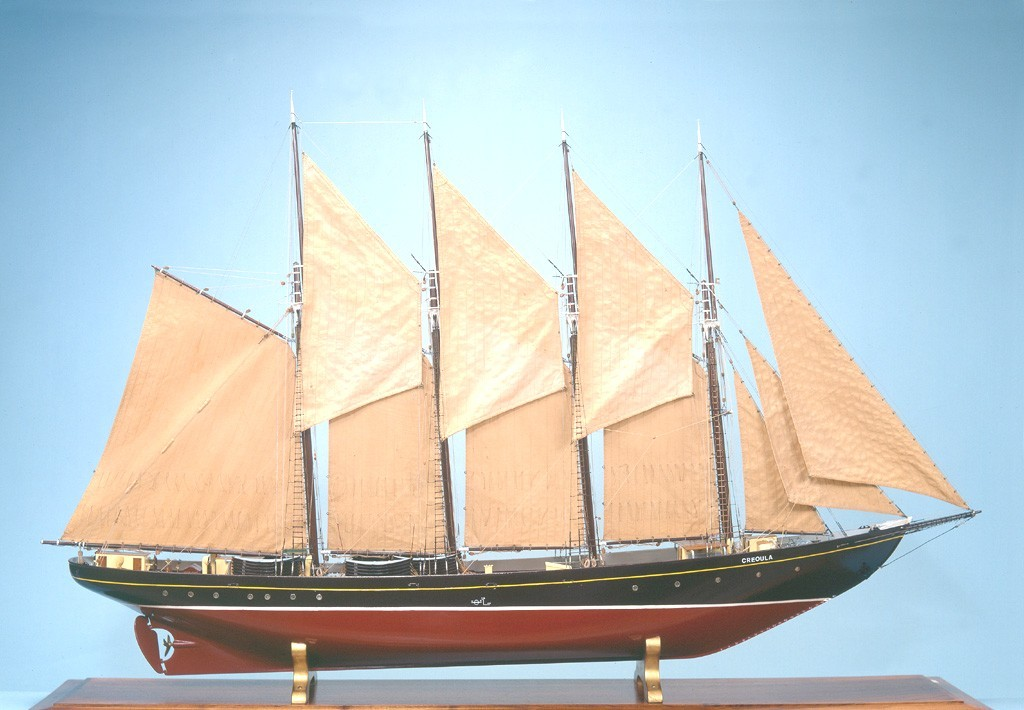
A maquette of the Creoula in the Navy Museum

UAM Creoula (Note: UAM: Unidades Auxiliares da Marinha (Naval Auxiliary Units)) or NTM Creoula is a training ship of the Portuguese Navy, built in 1937 in the Companhia União Fabril (CUF) shipyards in Lisbon for the Parceria Geral de Pescarias fishing company. From 1937 to 1973 she was used in a total of 37 cod fishing campaigns in Newfoundland and Greenland, for a total of 300.000 nautical miles. Between 1973 and 1979 she remained moored in Lisbon. She was then bought by the Secretariat of State for Fisheries to become a fishing museum. During the repairs it was noticed that the hull was in excellent condition, so it was decided that the ship should sail again. She was converted into a Portuguese Navy training ship in 1987. The boat's coat of arms consists of two silver cod fish in an azure field under a granny knot.
