= Eendracht (1989 ship) =

Sailing Ship

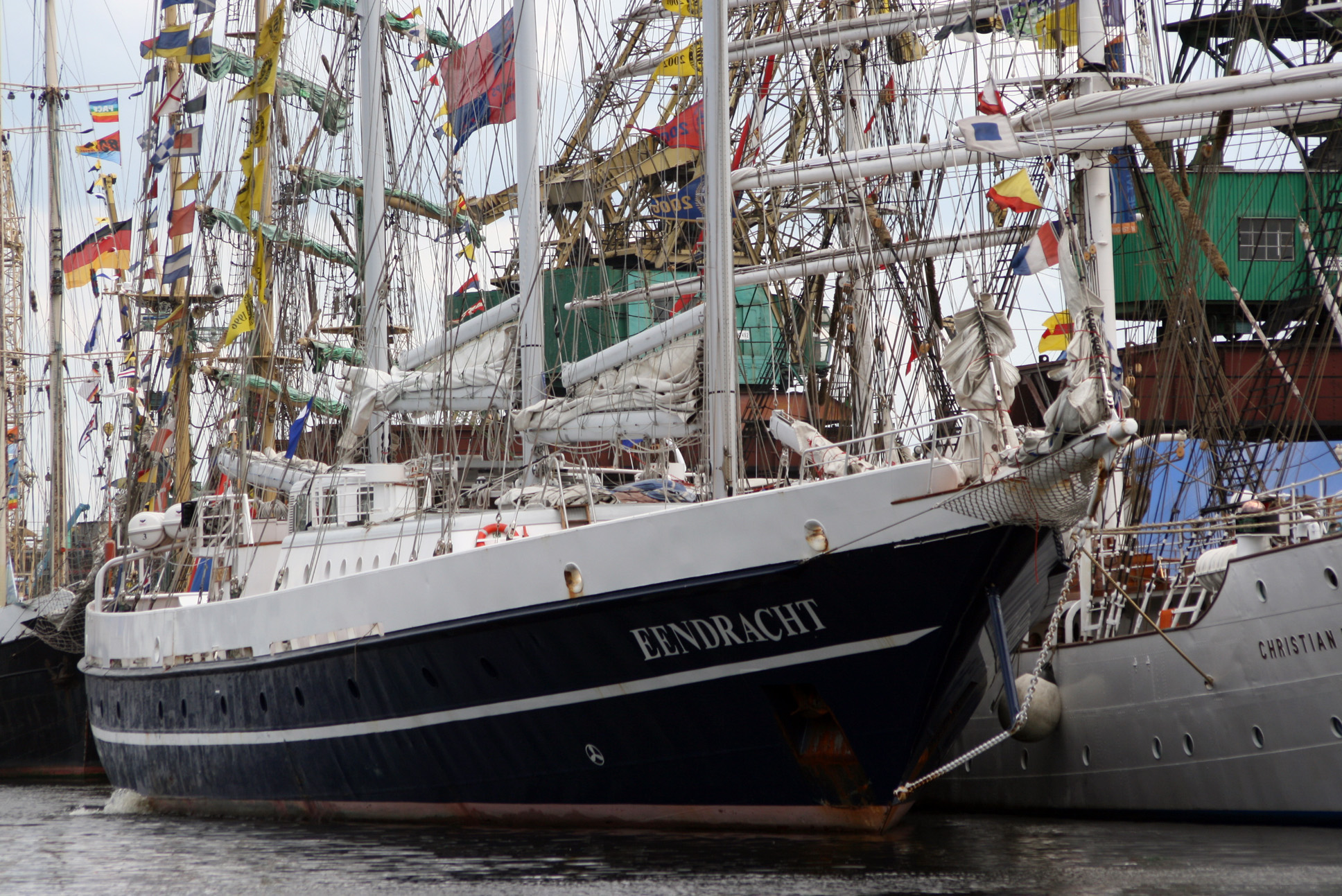
- Eendracht at Szczecin 2007

History

Netherlands
- Name: Eendracht
- Operator: Stichting het Zeilend Zeeschip
- Builder: Damen Group
- Launched: 1989
- Status: Active

General characteristics
- Type: Schooner
- Length: 59 m (193 ft 7 in)
- Beam: 12.3 m (40 ft 4 in)
- Propulsion: Sails
- Sail plan: Sail area 1,300 m^{2} (14,000 sq ft)
- Capacity: 40 passengers
- Crew: 13

Eendracht is a three-masted schooner from the Netherlands, built in 1989 at the Damen shipyard after a design by W. de Vries Lentsch.

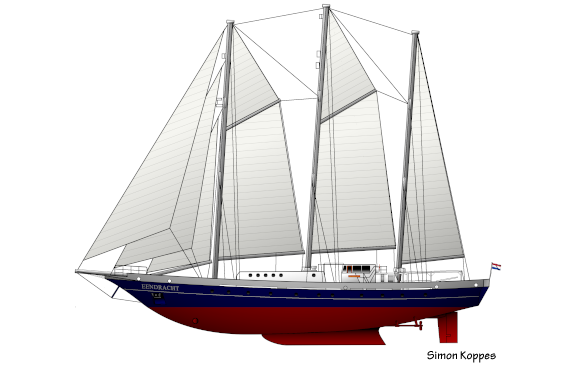
Line art of schooner Eendracht

She is now run on a charter base by Stichting het Zeilend Zeeschip (the Sailing Seaship Foundation) and used as a sail training ship to give young people an introduction to the sea. This is the second "Eendracht", Eendracht meaning 'unison' in the Dutch language, though a closer translation as a ship's name would be Concordia). The first vessel run by the same foundation was a two masted schooner, which was sold to German owners and now sails under the name of "Johann Smidt".

The foundation that runs the programme was founded in 1938 but with the second world war disrupting the plans, it took a lot longer than anticipated to raise the funds for the first ship. Soon after the first vessel, originally a topsail schooner, was launched, it was realised that the vessel was too small for the purposes of the foundation. Immediately the planning for a larger three masted vessel began.

This three-masted vessel has sailed continuously since her launch date. Every year she spends the winter months in the south, and the summer in the North Sea region. She has a crew of around 350 mostly professional, volunteers.

On 21 October 1998, Eendracht ran aground at Newhaven, East Sussex, United Kingdom. All 51 people on board were rescued by helicopter. She was later refloated and returned to service.

== See also ==
- List of large sailing vessels
- List of large sailing yachts
