= Sail Training International =

- Type: registered charity
- Industry: Education through Sail training
- Founded: Hampshire (2002)
- Headquarters: Hampshire, England,
- Products: Adventure and education under sail
- Website: sailtraininginternational.org/sailtraining/

Sail Training International (STI) is a non-profit international sail training organisation, with members in 29 countries. Its main aim is the "development and education of young people of all nations, cultures, and social backgrounds through the experience of sail training.". It is based in Hampshire in the United Kingdom and is a registered charity.

The organization organizes various activities such as regattas, seminars or conferences on the subject of "Sail Training". Sail Training International is best known for organizing the Tall Ships' Races, which are now followed and/or attended by hundreds of thousands of onlookers each year.

== The Tall Ships Races ==
Sail Training International runs the annual Tall Ships' Races in Europe and the north Atlantic which attract a fleet of up to 130 sail training vessels and draws millions of visitors to European ports.

== Other activities ==
Besides organising the Tall Ships' Races, STI is a provider of races and events, conferences and seminars, publications, research and services for the international sail training community. In 2014 they launched an International Sail Endorsement Scheme together with the Nautical Institute.

== History ==
In 1956, the Sail Training International Race Committee (STIRC) was formed in the United Kingdom to organize a unique international tall ships' regatta. Due to the popularity of the regatta with the public and participating vessels, the first regatta evolved into the regular Tall Ships' Races (1973–2003 under the name Cutty Sark Tall Ships' Races), which continued to be organized by the STIRC. It was later succeeded by the British Sail Training Association or the International Sail Training Association (ISTA), a wholly owned subsidiary of the British Sail Training Association, whose role was to continue to organize the Tall Ships' Races.

Today's Sail Training International was formed in 2002 by the 20 Sail Training Associations and organizations that exist around the world and promote the idea of Sail Training nationwide, to transfer ISTA's duties to a new and independent organization – one owned and controlled by the STAs of the various states.[4] Sail Training International took over ISTA's property, employees and contracts with regatta and event ports a few months after its formation.

Co-founding National Sail Training Organizations were those of Australia, Belgium, Bermuda, Canada, Denmark, Finland, Germany, Ireland, Italy, Latvia, the Netherlands, New Zealand, Norway, Poland, Portugal, Russia, Spain, Sweden, the United Kingdom, and the United States of America. Since 2003 Sail Training International has been recognized as a non-profit organization.

== Members ==
Members of STI are the national sail training associations of:

- Australia (Tall Ships Australia and New Zealand) Australian Sail Training Association merged with Sail Training Association New Zealand to form TANZ in 2017
- Belgium (Sail Training Association Belgium)
- Bermuda (Sail Training Association Bermuda)
- Canada (Canadian Sail Training Association)
- China (China Sail Training Association)
- Czech Republic (probationary member)
- Croatia (probationary member)
- Denmark
- Estonia (probationary member)
- Finland
- France (Amis des Grands Voiliers)
- Germany
- Greece
- Hungary (probationary member)
- India
- Ireland
- Italy
- Japan (probationary member)
- Latvia
- Lithuania
- Netherlands
- New Zealand (Tall Ships Australia and New Zealand)
- Norway
- Poland
- Portugal
- South Africa
- Spain
- Sweden
- Turkey
- United Kingdom (Association of Sail Training Organisations)
- United States of America (American Sail Training Association)

== Honours ==
In 2007 Sail Training International was nominated for the Nobel Peace Prize for its work in promoting international understanding and friendship.

== See also ==
- List of large sailing vessels

== Literature ==
- Rowe, Nigel. Tall Ships Today: Their remarkable story, Adlard Coles Trade, 2014, ISBN 1472903463, ISBN 978-1472903464
- Butcher, Amanda. Tall Ships Handbook, Amberley, 2014, ISBN 1445618893, ISBN 978-1445618890
