= Goetheborg =

Goetheborg is the spelling of Götheborg without diarctics. It may refer to:

- Gothenburg, modern English spelling of the second largest city of Sweden
- Götheborg, two Swedish East Indiamen and their modern replica
