= SV Tenacious =

2000 British wooden sail training ship

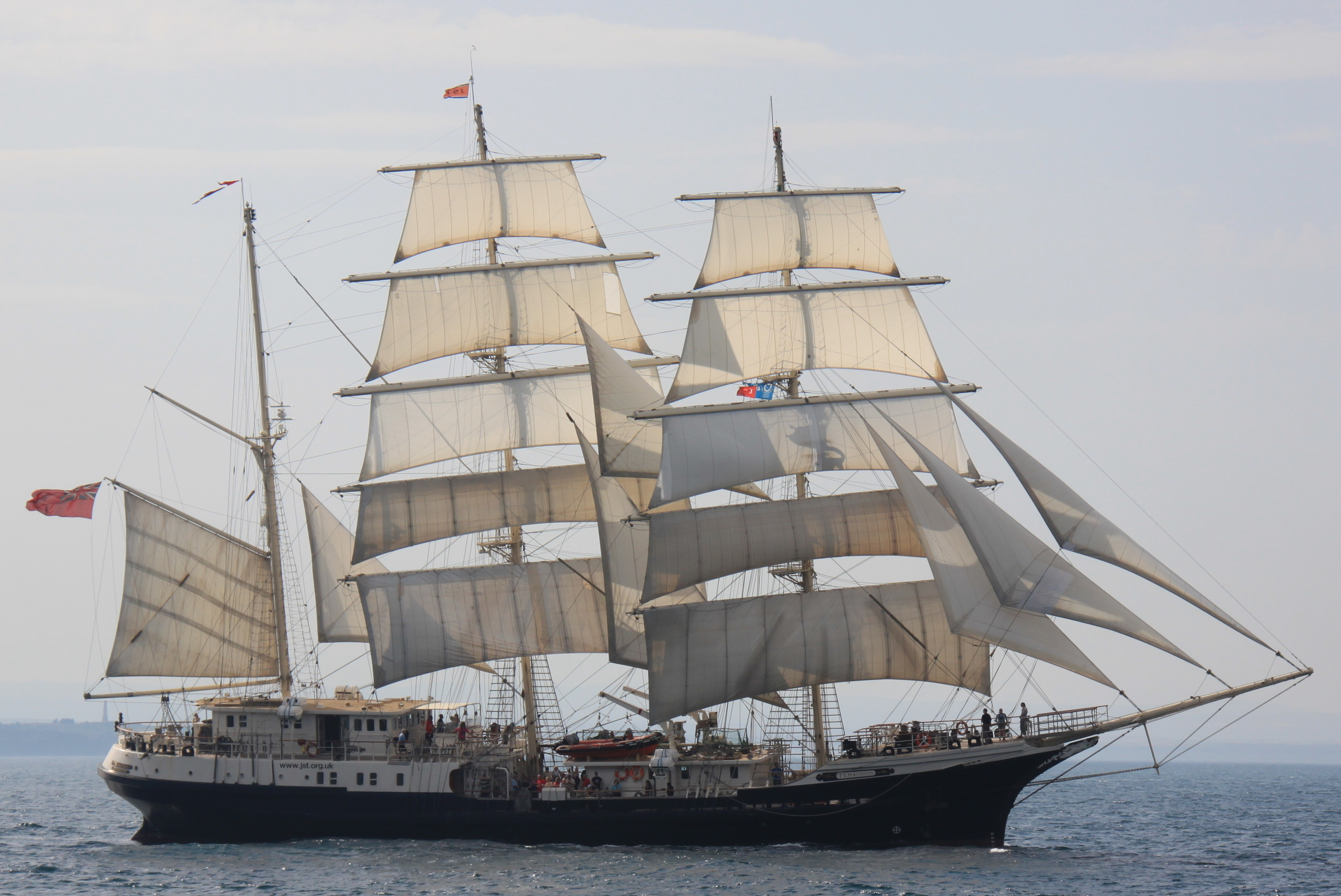
- SV Tenacious at the starting line for the last leg of the STI Historical Seas Festival 2010 from Istanbul to Lavrion.

History

United Kingdom
- Name: Tenacious
- Owner: Jubilee
- Builder: Jubilee Yard (Merlin Quay), Southampton
- Laid down: 6 June 1996
- Launched: 3 February 2000
- Commissioned: 1 September 2000
- Out of service: December 2023
- Identification: IMO number: 1005679; MMSI number: 235000230; Callsign: ZQHM2
- Status: Operational

General characteristics
- Tons burthen: 586 tons
- Length: 54 m (177 ft 2 in) hull, 65 m (213 ft 3 in) including bowsprit
- Beam: 10.6 m (34 ft 9 in)
- Draught: 4.58 m (15 ft 0 in) in summer
- Propulsion: Sails: 1,217 m^{2} (13,100 sq ft); Engines: 2 x 400 bhp (300 kW)
- Sail plan: Barque (three-masted))
- Speed: 11 knots (20 km/h; 13 mph) under sail; 8 knots (15 km/h; 9.2 mph) under power
- Complement: Permanent crew approx 11 (incl. 3 volunteers); Voyage crew up to 40 (50% of whom may be sensory impaired or physically disabled)

SV Tenacious

SV Tenacious is a modern British wooden sail training ship, specially designed in the 1990s. When completed in 2000, it was the largest wooden ship to be built in the UK for over 100 years.

== Design and construction ==
The ship was built by the Jubilee Sailing Trust (JST) and designed by Tony Castro. With STS Lord Nelson, the pair are the only tall ships in the world that were built so that both disabled and non-disabled people can sail as crew, not passengers. Features that cannot be found on other ships include wheelchair lifts throughout, a unique ascender systems that allow wheelchair users to go aloft (either assisted or by their own efforts), a speaking compass for those with visual impairments, hearing loops, adjustable furniture for those with mobility difficulties, and a joystick to help individuals with dexterity limitations to steer the ship. Everyone plays a full and active role in the voyage. The JST is a UN-accredited charity offering sailing adventures to people of all abilities and backgrounds. The ship is owned and operated by Jubilee Sailing Trust (Tenacious) Ltd.

Launched in 2000, the sailing vessel Tenacious is the largest wooden tall ship built in the United Kingdom in the last 100 years. It is 65 metres (213 ft 3 in) long including bowsprit, and it is rigged as a three-masted barque with two mizzen gaffs. Its deck is 49.85 metres (163 ft 7 in) long, its hull is 54.02 metres (177 ft 3 in) long, and it has a beam of 10.6 metres (34 ft 9 in) at its widest point. Tenacious displaces about 714 tons (summer draft). A press release from the Belfast Maritime Festival on 22 June 2006 announced that the Tenacious was "the largest wooden ship still afloat". (see also, the Götheborg and USS Constitution for large wooden hulled, sailing vessels that are still sailed)

The yacht Creole is a similar sized wooden sailing vessels still sailed at 63.7 meters long. Another similar sized wooden sailing vessel is the Götheborg at 65 meters, and the largest of still sailing vessels is the USS Constitution at 93 meters using the length to the bowsprit in both cases.

== History ==
The ship's maiden voyage was on 1 September 2000 from Southampton to Sark, St Helier and Weymouth before returning to Southampton. The ship is owned by a UK-based charity, the Jubilee Sailing Trust, which also owns the 42-metre-long tall ship STS Lord Nelson (length including bowsprit is 55 m, 180 ft 5 in and waterline length is 37 m, 121 ft 5 in).

Tenacious featured in the first series of Channel 5's Sea Patrol UK, when one of the crew members had fallen ill and needed to be winched into a Royal Air Force Westland Sea King helicopter and taken to hospital. Due to the height of the masts and rigging, this posed a challenge to the helicopter's pilot and winch crew but the rescue attempt was successful and the crew member survived a potentially fatal condition.

In December 2023 the JST announced that Tenacious's owning company was insolvent and had been put into liquidation and that all future cruises had been cancelled. In 2024, a campaign group called 'Save Tall Ship Tenacious' was formed to save the ship.

== See also ==
- List of large sailing vessels
- List of longest wooden ships
