= STS Lord Nelson =

Three-masted steel hulled sailing ship

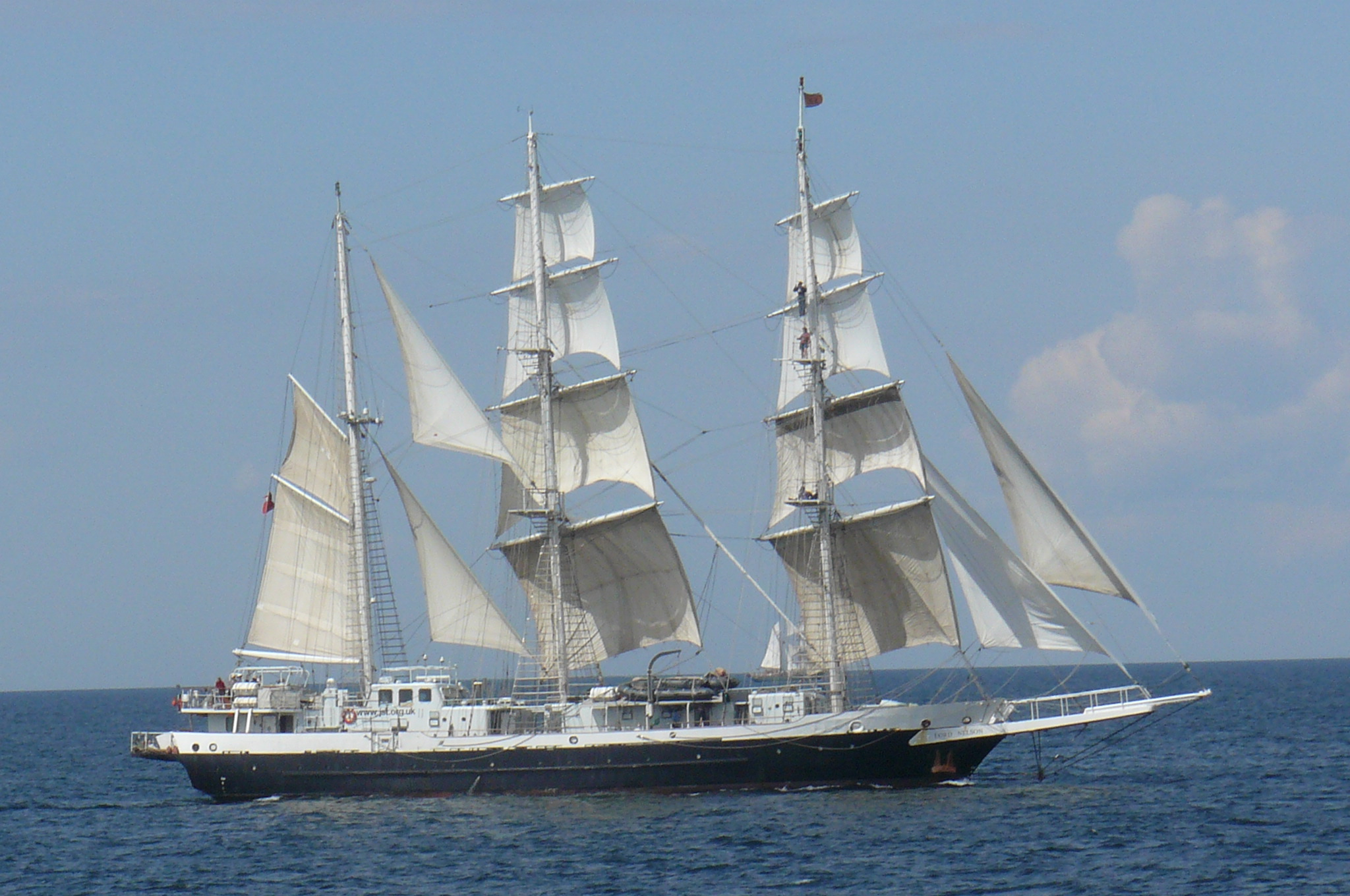

History

United Kingdom
- Name: Lord Nelson
- Owner: Jubilee Sailing Trust
- Builder: James W. Cook & Co. (Wivenhoe)
- Yard number: 1508
- Launched: 15 October 1985
- Decommissioned: 2019
- Identification: IMO number: 1002495; MMSI number: 232003690; Callsign: GHJV
- Status: For Sale

General characteristics
- Length: 54,7 m
- Propulsion: Sails: 1024sq m; Engines: 2 x Cummins Diesel
- Sail plan: Barque (three-masted)

STS Lord Nelson was a sail training ship operated by the Jubilee Sailing Trust. She was designed by Colin Mudie and launched on 17 October 1986.

The ship was built by the Jubilee Sailing Trust (JST) and, along with the SV Tenacious, the pair were the only tall ships in the world that are wheelchair accessible throughout. The JST are an international UN accredited charity offering sailing adventures to people of all abilities and backgrounds. She was decommissioned in October 2019.

== Design and construction ==
STS Lord Nelson was commissioned by the Jubilee Sailing Trust, and the build was started in the summer of 1984 at the yard of James W Cook, Wivenhoe, Essex. She was designed by Colin Mudie, and is his design no 342. The ship was launched almost a year after the formal keel laying. After J W Cook went into voluntary liquidation, Lord Nelson was moved to Vosper Thornycroft's yard in Woolston, Southampton. As a result of an industrial dispute at Vospers, Lord Nelson had to move again, this time to Coles Yard in Cowes where the remainder of the work was carried out. She was finally sailed in completed form from Southampton on 17 October 1986.

== In service ==
STS Lord Nelson completed more than 1,600 accessible voyages during her 33 years at sea with the Jubilee Sailing Trust.

She finished her final voyage on 10 October 2019 to Southampton, and was subsequently moved to Bristol docks for decommissioning.

== Disposal ==
On the 26 April 2021 the Jubilee Sailing Trust announced that they would sell the vessel, by then in a state of significant disrepair. No sale of Lord Nelson was concluded and in August 2022, the ship's owning company, Jubilee Sailing Trust Ltd, was put into administration. With still no sale, the administrators put the ship for auction in June 2023. By 2026, following unsuccessful auctions, she had been bought by a private organisation, Good Pirates, with an intention to restore to sailing condition.
