= Jubilee Sailing Trust =

Former UK sailing charity for the disabled

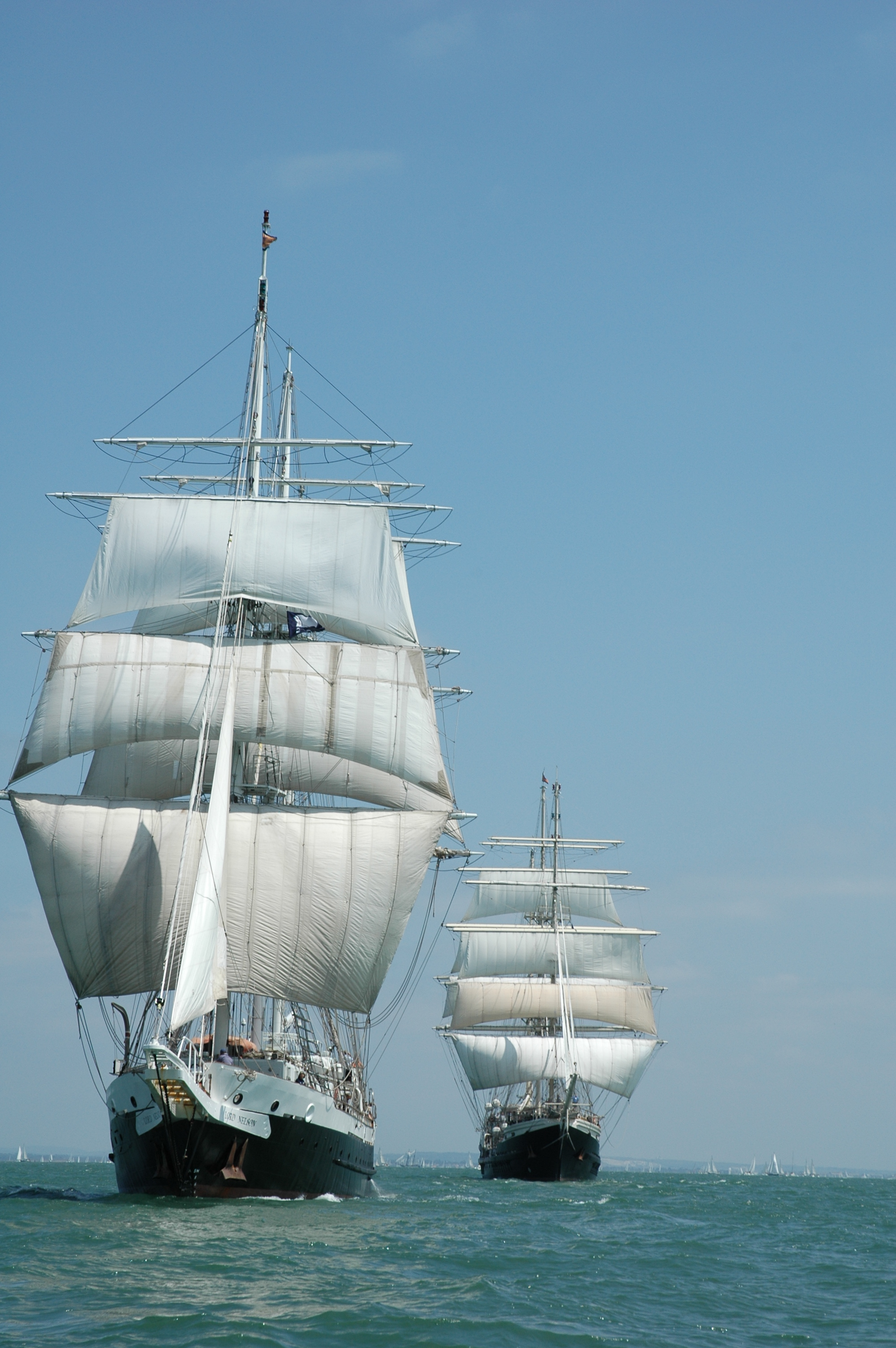
Lord Nelson front, Tenacious background.

Jubilee Sailing Trust was a charitable organisation in the United Kingdom which operated the purpose-built three-masted barques STS Lord Nelson and SV Tenacious, both specifically designed for the physically handicapped to be able to fully engage with the sailing experience.

== Aims ==
The Jubilee Sailing Trust, based in Southampton, was a sail training charity registered with the Charity Commission. Founded in 1978 with money from the Silver Jubilee of Elizabeth II fund by Christopher Rudd, a keen sailor, its aims are: "To integrate both able-bodied and disabled persons through Tall Ship sailing".

== Ships ==
In early pilot schemes including voyages in the square-rigged vessels the Marques, TS Royalist and (between 1982 and 1985) Søren Larsen, it was established that square-riggers were suitable for fulfilling the Trust's aims. Subsequently the Trust commissioned the building of STS Lord Nelson (designed by Colin Mudie), which sailed on her maiden voyage from Southampton to Cherbourg on 17 October 1986, and SV Tenacious (to a design by Tony Castro), which made her maiden voyage on 1 September 2000, also from Southampton.

Lord Nelson and Tenacious were pioneers in the world of tall ships. They are the only two vessels which have been designed and purpose-built to allow people of all physical abilities to sail side-by-side on equal terms. There are 8 wheelchair cabins with two bunks each, with the remaining accommodation being 'dorm-style'. All beds are fixed single bunks. Both vessels are equipped with additional measures to allow for disabled people to sail, including: a speaking compass, visual and tactile alarms around the ship to supplement emergency announcements, disabled toilets, signage and diagrams in Braille, power-assisted steering for the ship's wheel, wheelchair lifts around the ship, wider passageways, and tactile markers to assist the visually impaired in finding their way around.

== Activities ==
Each year the JST takes around 2,000 adults to sea, both able-bodied and physically disabled. Each ship can sail with up to 40 voyage crew, half of whom may be physically disabled and are guided through each task on board by eight or nine permanent crew members (professional seafarers) and three or more volunteer crew. The ships sail around the United Kingdom, Western Europe, the Canary Islands and the Caribbean.

From October 2012 to September 2014, STS Lord Nelson sailed around the world in the first JST circumnavigation, visiting 30 countries spanning all seven continents. In October 2013, STS Lord Nelson participated in the International Fleet Review 2013 in Sydney, Australia.

== Support ==
Despite a successful business model selling spaces on their tall ship, JST also relies on funding, donations, and corporate partnerships to achieve their vision. As of 2022, JST had nine 'Champions' including: Actisense, Ardent Training, Classic Sailing, Cruising Association, easyBoat, English Braids, Hill Dickinson LLP, AH Monsen Ltd, and Swig Wines.

== Emergency appeal and cutbacks ==
In June 2019, the JST announced an 'emergency appeal', with a week to save the charity. The charity's handling of the appeal and its aftermath raised criticism from many in the sail training world. Despite raising more than £1m in five days, it was announced that STS Lord Nelson would cease its sailing programme by October. There was a further planned review of organisational structures to reduce core costs, with the intent to achieve a "stronger financial footing".

In early 2021, having laid alongside Bristol docks and in a state of significant disrepair, Lord Nelson was put up for sale. In May 2022, Peter Cardy, former CEO of the Maritime & Coastguard Agency and Sail Training International, after reviewing the recent history of the JSA and its challenges, concluded, "Without a radical change of programme, and effective marketing of a focus and quality not seen for many years, merely tinkering with the model means the maelstrom awaits yet again. Next time around there might be no other option than insolvency and administration."

No sale of Lord Nelson was concluded and in August 2022, the ship's owning company, Jubilee Sailing Trust Ltd, was put into administration. With still no sale, the administrators put the ship for auction in June 2023.

In December 2023 it was announced that Jubilee Sailing Trust (Tenacious) Ltd could not continue and had also been put into administration, with all planned voyages cancelled and Tenacious to be sold. The future of the Trust itself will be determined by the Charity Commission.

== See also ==
- Sea Cadet Corps
- Tall Ships Youth Trust
  - Stavros S Niarchos
