= Matthew (1497 ship) =

Ship sailed by John Cabot in 1497

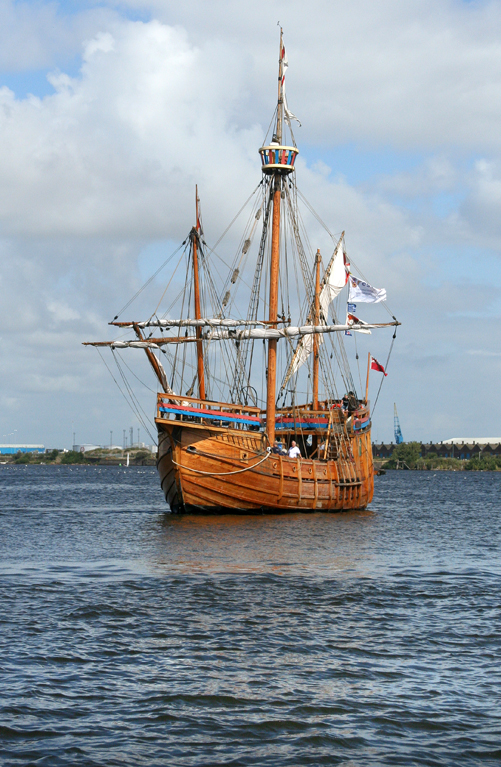
- A replica of Matthew in Cardiff Bay

History

England
- Name: Matthew
- Builder: Storms'l Services
- Laid down: 1994
- Launched: 1996
- Home port: Bristol

General characteristics
- Type: replica caravel
- Displacement: 85
- Tons burthen: 50
- Length: Length overall: 78 ft (24 m)
- Beam: 20 ft 6 in (6.25 m)
- Height: 72.5 ft 6 in (22.25 m)
- Draught: 7 ft 6 in (2.29 m)
- Decks: 2
- Installed power: 200hp Caterpillar 3116
- Propulsion: sail, engine
- Sail plan: caravel

Matthew was a caravel sailed by John Cabot in 1497 from Bristol to Newfoundland, North America. There are two modern replicas – one in Bristol, England (built 1994–1996) and one in Bonavista, Newfoundland (built 1997–1998).

== Cabot's original voyages ==
The captain of Matthew was a Venetian explorer named Zuan or Giovanni Caboto who is better known in England as John Cabot. Following an abortive voyage in 1496, Cabot left again with only one vessel, Matthew, a small ship (50 tons). The crew consisted of only 18 men. The Matthew departed 2 May 1497. He sailed north and west, expecting to reach Asia. However, landfall was reached in North America on 24 June 1497. His precise landing place is a matter of much controversy, with Cape Bonavista or St. John's in Newfoundland the most likely sites. There is a statue of John Cabot located at Cape Bonavista, Newfoundland in his honour.

Cabot went ashore to take possession of the land, and explored the coast for some time, probably departing on 20 July. On the homeward voyage his sailors incorrectly thought they were going too far north, so Cabot sailed a more southerly course, reaching Brittany instead of England. On 6 August he arrived back in Bristol.

== Historic information ==
Lack of clear documentation has been a problem in studying the history of Matthew. Even its name has been questioned, with some authors suggesting that it was actually named Mattea after Cabot's wife. Until the 1950s, all that was known about its size is that it was a small ship carrying about 18 men, but the discovery of a letter from a Bristol merchant named John Day written in 1497 saying that "in his voyage he had only one ship of fifty 'toneles' and twenty men and food for seven or eight months" provided more certainty about its size. The age of the ship is also uncertain. The name Matthew does not appear in the 1492/3 customs accounts, so it was either fairly new or an older ship renamed or a foreign ship. It has been suggested that it probably was an ordinary Bristol merchant ship hired for the occasion. The name Matthew appears in documents in 1503/04 and 1510/11 but in a 1513 survey there is reference to a 'new Matthew' and references to this ship afterward leave out the 'new' suggesting that Cabot's Matthew no longer existed.

== Bristol replica ==
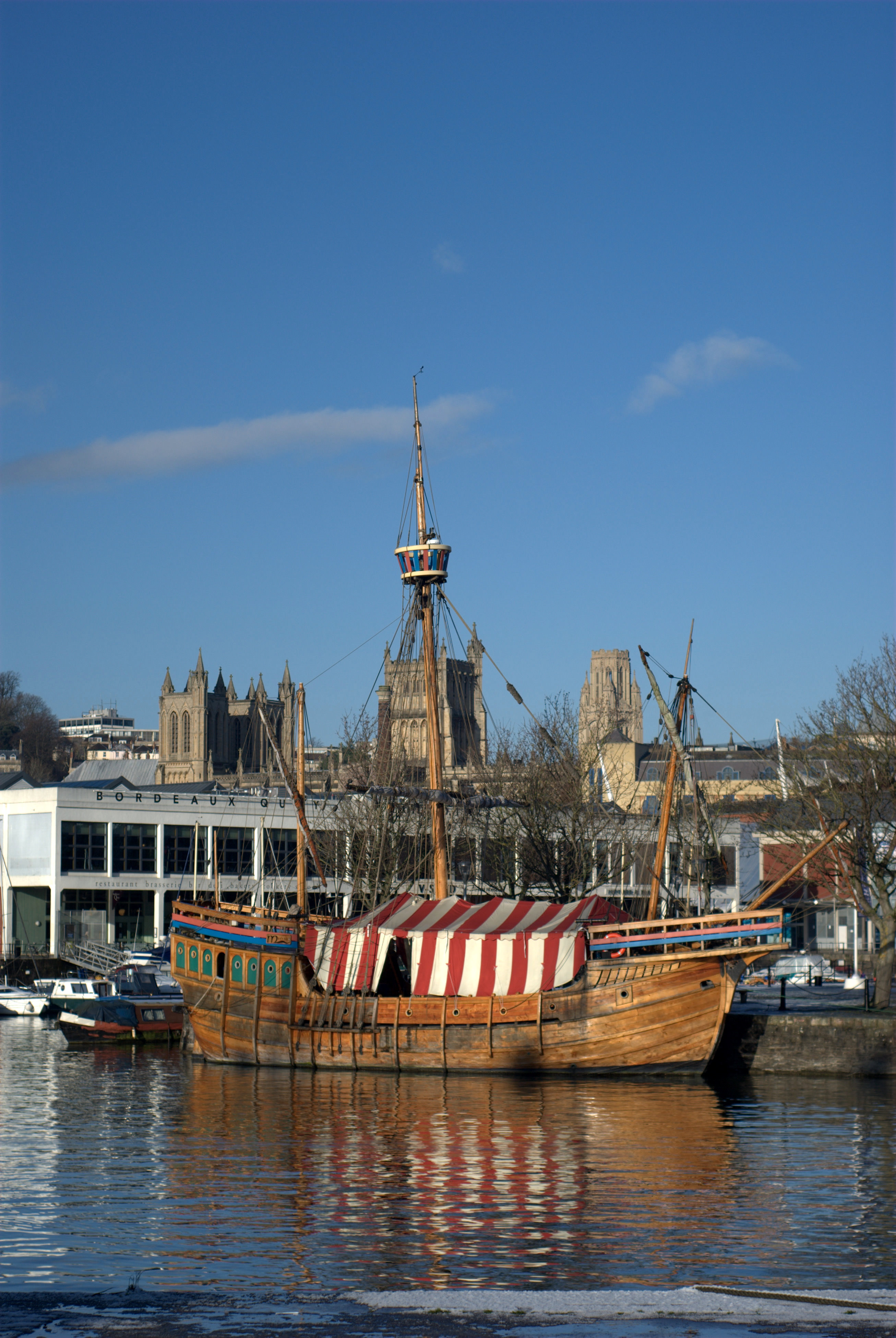
Matthew replica moored in Bristol

To celebrate the 500th anniversary of Cabot's voyage, a replica of Matthew was built in Bristol by Storms'l Services, a precursor of the Bristol Classic Boat Company. The design was by naval architect Colin Mudie. It took two years to complete the replica and cost $3.8 million. She was dedicated in a ceremony during the first International Festival of the Sea, held in Bristol's Floating Harbour in 1996. The next year, she reconstructed Cabot's original journey on the 500th anniversary of the landmark voyage. On 24 June 1997 the replica of Matthew was welcomed into port at Bonavista by Queen Elizabeth II. The Matthew is owned by Bristol Trust, which is a registered charity and all money raised goes towards maintaining the ship and her legacy.

The full-size replica is 78 ft (24 m) in length overall with a beam of 20 ft 6 in (6.25 m) with a draft of 7 ft (2.1 m) and 2,360 sq ft (219 m^{2}) of sail. This replica is made from oak and Douglas fir and has a diesel engine and a ship radio that would not have been available in the medieval times.

On 29 February 2012 Matthew's ownership was transferred to The Matthew of Bristol Trust, a registered charity, and she was relocated to her new home outside Bristol's M Shed museum.

In June 2012 she took part in the Queen's Diamond Jubilee pageant on the River Thames.

== Bonavista replica ==
The Bonavista replica (48°39′3.69″N 53°6′55.46″W) was built in 1997–98 by a team of seven shipwrights and four local carpenters. The second replica was paid for by the provincial government and so was an interpretation centre for the 500th anniversary. Currently the vessel is undergoing repairs so she can sail again. There are tours for this replica that take place at the Bonavista harbour where individuals can learn more about Cabot's voyage and see the inside of the replica ship.

== See also ==
- Ship replica (including a list of replicas)
