= Bristol Classic Boat Company =

The Bristol Classic Boat Company is a boat building and restoration company based at Bristol's Floating Harbour, England.

The company has its origins in Storms'l Services a group of shipwrights who formed in about 1986 to undertake the complete rebuild of Aello Beta, a 100 ft (30 m) gaff schooner designed and built by Max Oertz in 1920. Storms'l Services completed major restorations on a number of ships including the yawls Voluta and Samphire and the Clyde cutter Tigris. Most famously members of the company built the 50 tons burthen replica of John Cabot's 15th century caravel, the Matthew, with Colin Mudie in 1996 at Redcliffe Wharf.

The Bristol Classic Boat Company was founded in 1999 by company director Mark Rolt. It builds and restores traditional wooden sailing and motor vessels. The company has rebuilt two Fairey marine Huntsmen motor cruisers and various yachts, in addition to carrying out refits of small craft and canal boats. In 2008 the Pegasus, a traditional designed by Burnett Yacht Design based on the Bristol Channel Pilot Cutter, was built for the Island Trust. The company also maintains the boats for the Bristol Ferry Boat Company.
