= Colin Mudie =

Colin Mudie (11 April 1926 – 11 March 2020) was an Edinburgh-born yacht designer, author, naval historian, balloonist, and advocate for the handicapped sailor. He studied engineering at Southampton University, before working under yacht designers including Laurent Giles and Uffa Fox. He then set up his own firm. He received the award of RDI (Royal Designer for Industry) for Small craft/ naval in 1995.

== Yachts ==
Mudie is particularly celebrated for his range of boat designs, including motorsailers, small sailing cruiser/racers, luxury yachts, and tall ships. Among the tall ship designs are examples for crews which include both handicapped and able-bodied crew members.

=== Motorsailers ===
Mudie designed the early range of Hardy motorsailers.

=== Cruiser/racers ===
Mudie's cruiser/racer yacht designs include:

- SUNSPOT -13.8 feet (4.2 m) 1972
- WING 25 -25 feet (7.6 m) 1963

=== Luxury yachts ===
Mudie designed a number of luxury yachts, including:

- Zinat Al-Bihaar 60.99 metres (200.1 ft) Omani RYS 1988
- Ashena 46.51 metres (152.6 ft) built by Wadia 2006
- Passionata 27.4 metres (90 ft) built by Astilleros Udondo 1973

=== Tall ships ===
- The 'Little Brigs' TS Bob Allen and TS Caroline Allen
- INS Sudarshini (A77) is a sister ship of INS Tarangini (A75); three-masted commissioned 1997
- INS Tarangini (A75) constructed in Goa - design by Colin Mudie, launched 1 December 1995.
- KLD Tunas Samudera training ship, Royal Malaysian Navy -launched in 1989. Colin Mudie also designed a sister ship (the Young Endeavour)
- STS Young Endeavour (Australian Young Endeavour Youth Scheme) laid down by Brooke Marine (which became Brooke Yachts during the vessel's construction), built 1986-1988
- STS Lord Nelson for the Jubilee Sailing Trust (JST), launched 1986
- TS Royalist Groves and Guttridge, East Cowes, Isle of Wight. launched on 3 August 1971

=== Replicas ===
- Matthew, a replica of John Cabot's 15th century caravel, the Matthew, 1996. Built at Redcliffe Wharf by the Bristol Classic Boat Company.
- Brendan, a 36' (15m) replica of the leather curragh that St Brendan is reputed to have sailed across the Atlantic in the 6th century, which Tim Severin commissioned and in which he successfully completed the voyage.

== Books ==
Mudie authored several books on boats and their history of development:

- Motor Boats and Boating (Littlehampton Book Services Ltd, 1972) ISBN 9780600359807
- Power Boats (Transatlantic Arts, 1976) ISBN 9780600370451
- Power Yachts (with Rosemary Mudie) (Adlard Coles Ltd., 1 Jul 1977) ISBN 9780229986637
- The Story of the Sailing Ship (with Rosemary Mudie) (Exeter Books, 1980) ISBN 9780896730571
- Advanced Sailboat Cruising Hardcover (with G.Hales Handford) (Macmillan, 1981) ISBN 978-0333318072
- The Sailing Ship. A voyage through the ages (ed., with Rosemary Mudie) (Roydon Publishing Company, 1984) ISBN 9780946674060
- Sopranino (with Patrick Ellam) (Sheridan House Inc, 1986) ISBN 9780246129437
- Sailing Ships: Designs and Reconstructions of Great Sailing Ships from Ancient Greece to the Present Day (Bloomsbury Publishing Plc, 2000) ISBN 9780713653243
