= Götheborg (ship) =

Replica of the Götheborg I ship

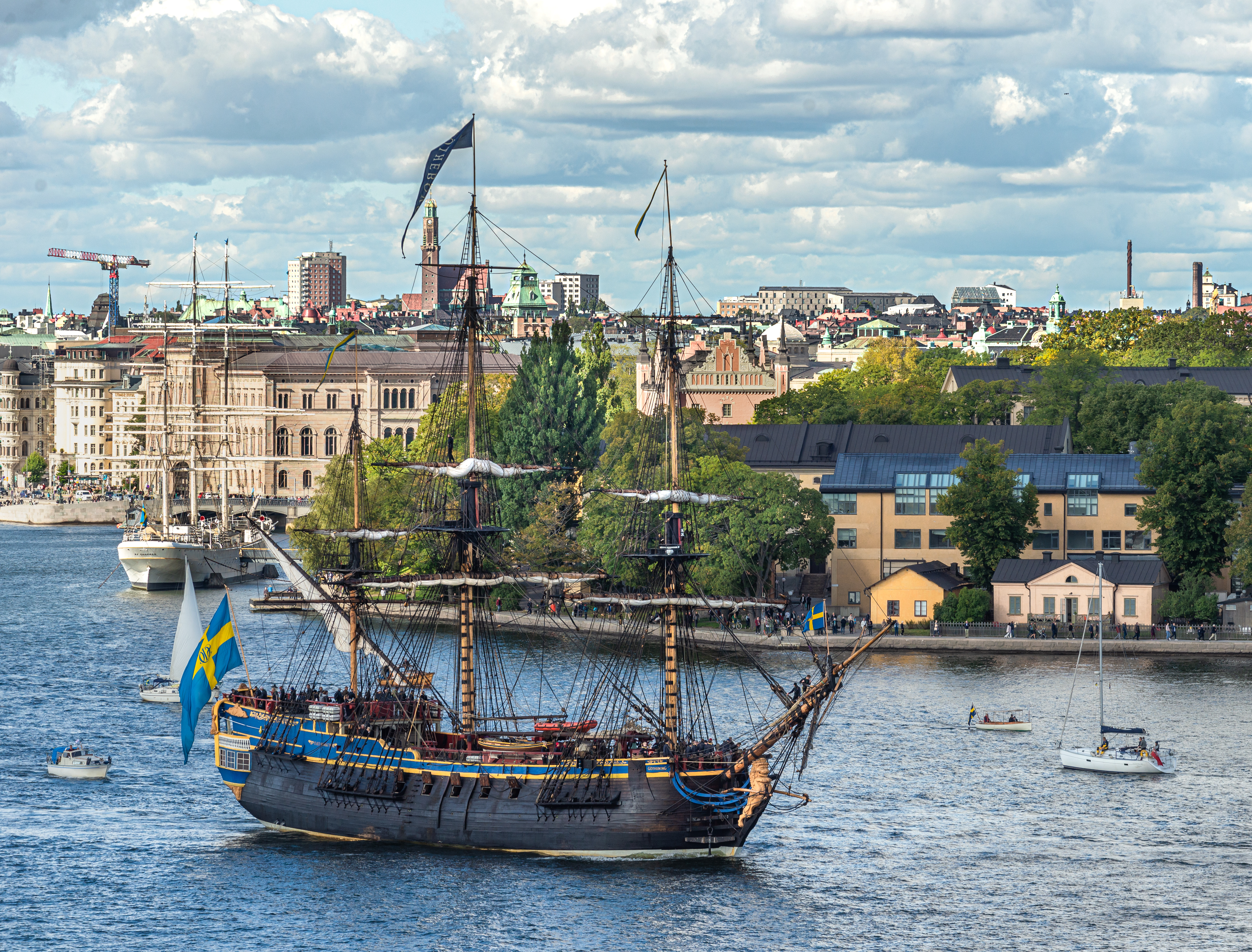
- Götheborg in Stockholm in 2021

History

Sweden
- Name: Götheborg of Sweden
- Owner: Svenska Ostindiska Companiet AB
- Port of registry: Gothenburg
- Builder: Terra Nova shipyard, Gothenburg
- Laid down: 11 June 1995
- Launched: 6 June 2003
- Sponsored by: Queen Silvia
- Christened: 3 September 2004
- Maiden voyage: 6 August 2005
- In service: 18 April 2005
- Identification: IMO number: 8646678; Call sign: SLOA; MMSI number: 266198000
- Status: in active service, as of 2025

General characteristics
- Type: Sailing vessel
- Tonnage: 788 GT; 166 DWT
- Length: 58 m (190 ft 3 in) (inc. bowsprit); 40.9 m (134 ft 2 in) o/a; 40.55 m (133 ft 0 in) p/p
- Beam: 11 m (36 ft 1 in)
- Draught: 4.95 m (16 ft 3 in)
- Depth: 6.75 m (22 ft 2 in)
- Decks: 3
- Installed power: 2 × 180 kW (241 hp) Volvo Penta 103 generators
- Propulsion: 2 × 550 hp (410 kW) Volvo Penta diesel engines; 36,000 L (9,500 US gal) of fuel; 2 shafts
- Sail plan: Full-rigged ship; Sail area: 1,964 m^{2} (21,140 sq ft)
- Crew: 80 (20 professional & 60 volunteers)
- Armament: 10 × long guns

Götheborg of Sweden is a sailing replica of the Swedish East Indiaman Götheborg (I), launched in 1738 (not to be confused with the larger Götheborg (II), built some decades later). All sailors survived when the original ship sank off Gothenburg, Sweden, on 12 September 1745, while approaching the harbour on her return from a third voyage to China. Construction of the replica started in 1995, with the hull launched in 2003, and the rig fully tested for the first time in 2005. Much of the time was spent researching how to rebuild the replica. In 2008, Götheborg completed the first Baltic Sea Tour. It is one of the world's largest operational wooden sailing ships.

On 26 April 2023 the Götheborg effected a rescue at sea, coming to the aid of a yacht that had lost its rudder and was adrift.

== Swedish East India Company ==
The Swedish East India Company was established on 14 June 1731, to trade in East Asia. The company followed the Portuguese, Dutch, Danish, French and English East India Companies. Situated in Gothenburg, the company secured a 15-year monopoly on far eastern trade, exchanging Swedish timber, tar, iron and copper for tea, porcelain and silk.

The company existed for 82 years and its vessels made 131 voyages using 37 different ships. Even though the company in the end went bankrupt, it made enormous profits during most of its years in operation and influenced the history of Sweden in several ways.

== Original ship ==
Götheborg was built at the Terra Nova shipyard in Stockholm and launched in 1738. According to writer Björn Ahlander, it only took about one and a half years to build a ship of this size in the 1700s. It was built in the Swedish capital and named Götheborg because the Swedish East India Company resided in Gothenburg, and all expeditions began and ended at this port. The ship had a tonnage equivalent to about 830 t (1,830,000 lb). On its maiden voyage in 1739, the ship carried 30 cannons and an initial crew of 144.

The ship made three journeys to China and in 1745, it sank on its way into Gothenburg harbor. After 30 months at sea, and with only 900 m (3,000 ft) to go before the vessel reached its berth, it crashed into the Knipla Börö, a well known rock. Although it remains a mystery how this could happen theories abound. The ship remained stranded on the rock while much of the cargo, consisting of tea, porcelain, spices and silk was salvaged. The ship was clearly visible above the surface of the water for many years, but in time the remains sank to the bottom.

=== Sinking ===
Ostindiebådarna
- Location within Västra Götaland
- 57°46′30″N 11°45′30″E
- Location: Gothenburg

Site notes
- Excavation dates: 1986–1992
- Archaeologists: Marinarkeologiska Sällskapet, Göteborgskretsen

It is still unclear what caused the ship to run aground due to the scarcity of contemporary written sources. Götheborg had a very experienced pilot on board, Caspar Matthisson (1712–1783) from Brännö, who had been a pilot for seven and a half years at the time of the accident. Even so, the ship suddenly ran aground, or crashed into, the underwater rock the Hunnebådan—in the 18th century known as the Knipla Börö and later the Götheborgs-grundet ("the Götheborg's rock") or the Ostindiebådarna ("the East India shallow").

Excerpt from a contemporary transcript of Captain Eric Moréen's ship's protest, 19 September 1745:

... the impact was so hard that the front of the ship, which had struck the rock, was lifted 4.5 ft (1.4 m) out of the water, and as the side had been holed, the ship soon began to take in a lot of water; it could be seen from the pump's water-level gauge that the water was 20, 30 and within a few minutes 60 in (1.5 m) deep inside the ship. The danger was announced with cannon shots and normal signals ...

The joint statement by captain Eric Moréen and the crew to the Göteborgs Rådhusrätt ("the Municipal Court of Gothenburg") on the 19 September 1745 states that the weather on 12 September was fair and clear, the wind amenable and blowing from south-west or west-southwest. These were ideal conditions since the wind would be coming almost straight from aft. Crossing the Rivöfjorden the ship met with the current from the northern part of Göta älv, Nordre älv. Navigation and sailing seems to have been correct up until the time of the accident. Sailing at a speed of 3 kn (3.5 mph) the ship suddenly veered to starboard and hit the rock. The cause may have been a now almost forgotten hydrographic phenomenon called dead water.

Hydrographic conditions at the mouth of the Göta älv in September 1745, are well known. The discharge of the Göta älv was unusually large due to heavy snowfall during the winter of 1744–45. The water level of Lake Vänern was also extremely high in 1745. These factors combined into an increase in the volume of fresh water flowing into the Älvsborgsfjorden, affecting the layers of fresh and salt water, making the conditions for dead water very favorable on 12 September 1745. It may be that the Götheborg was suddenly trapped by dead water when making its final change of course, causing the ship to lose rudder function, go off course and run aground.

=== Excavation ===
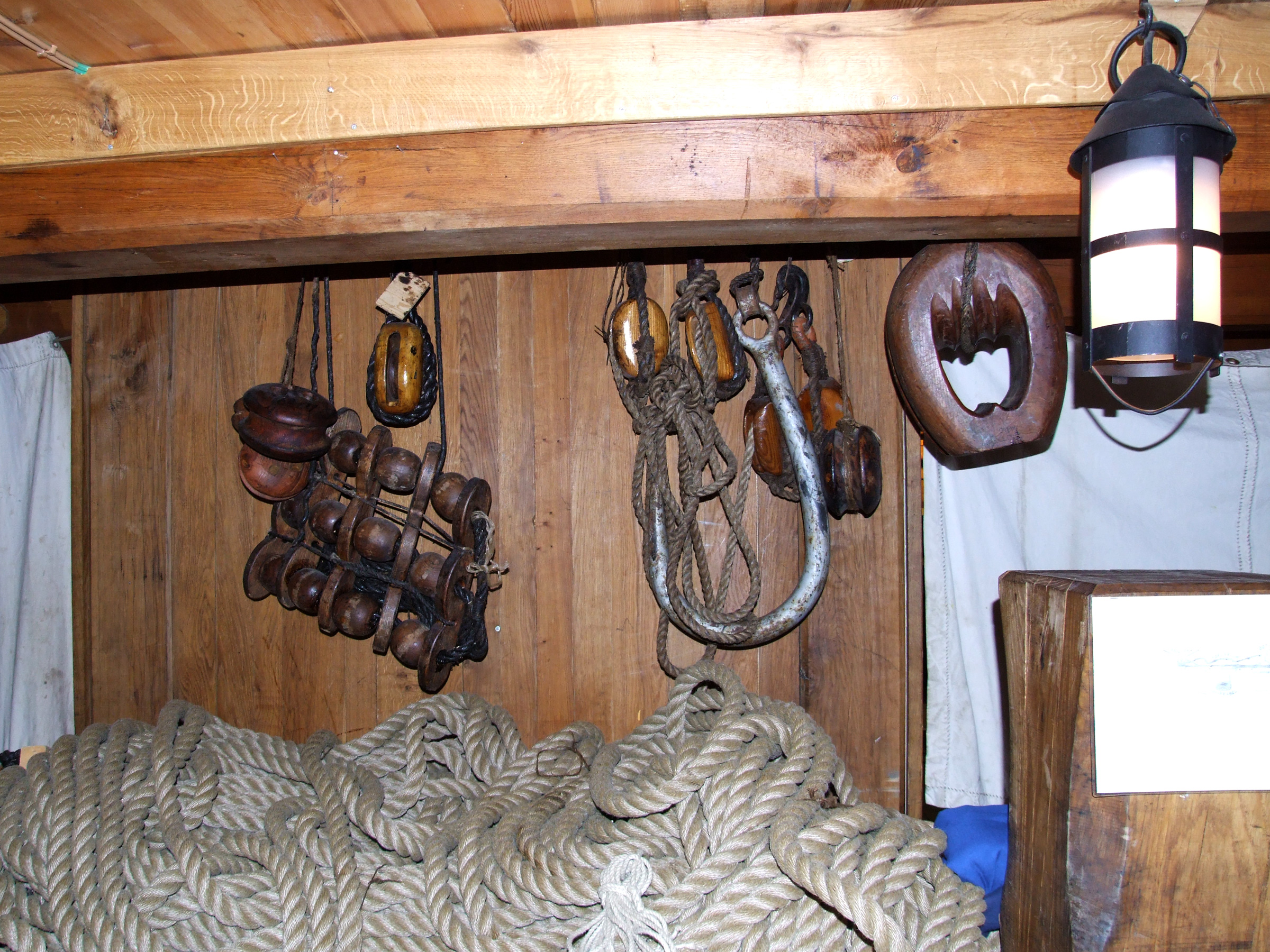
Items recovered from original ship

In 9 December 1984, five members from the Marinarkeologiska Sällskapet, Göteborgskretsen (MASG) ("the Marine Archeological Society of Gothenburg") dove at the Hunnebådan, the site of the shipwreck. One of the participants, Anders Wästfelt chairman of the MASG, wrote in his report: "Fair weather, sun, 7 °C (45 °F) in the air. Northwesterly wind 5–6 m/s (11–13 mph). Water temperature 6 °C (43 °F). Weak currents. Visibility in the water: Depth 0–2 m (0.0–6.6 ft), visibility 0.5 m (1.6 ft). Depth 4 m (13 ft), visibility about 3 m (9.8 ft). Depth 10 m (33 ft), visibility about 5 m (16 ft). Dives made between 12:00 a.m. and 1:00 p.m. … We picked up 38 pieces of porcelain. Three of these were almost undamaged. These were found on the softer sediments of the bottom. All the finds were on the bottom. No digging or use of a water eductor was done. The finds have been submitted to the Gothenburg Maritime museum."

Many porcelain shards were found strewn over the sea floor. In 1986, research in archives and examination of the wreck site had confirmed the find as the ship Götheborg from 1738, and the Gothenburg Maritime museum was given permission from the Swedish National Heritage Board to excavate the site. At the same time the East Indiaman Götheborg Foundation (the first foundation) was established, marking the beginning of one of Sweden's most comprehensive marine archeological surveys at the time. The purpose of the excavation was, among others, to use the wreck of the Götheborg as base for spreading knowledge about the history of Gothenburg and the significance of the Swedish East India Company during the 1700s.

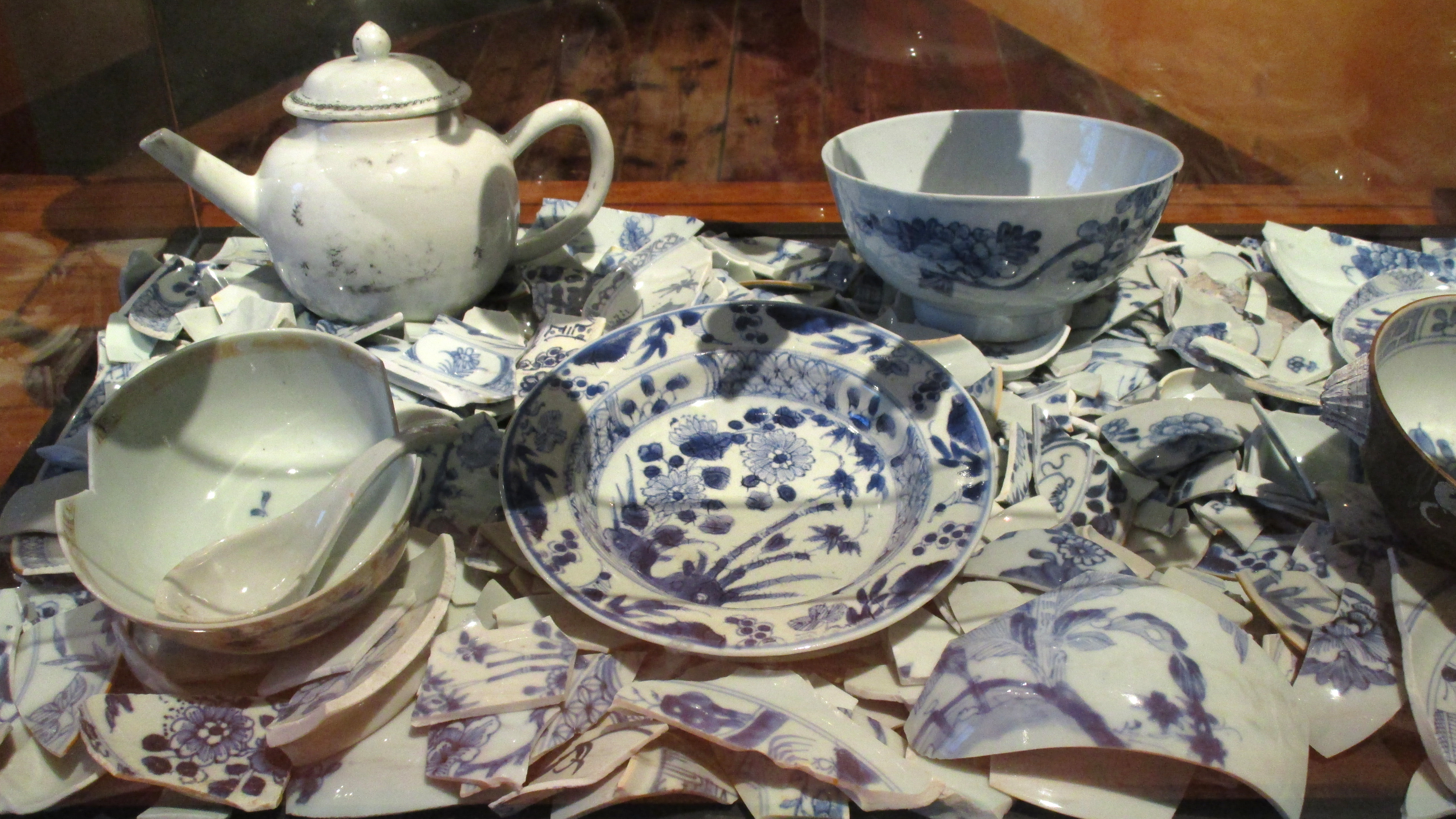
Porcelain items found during the excavation

The excavations were carried out during the summers 1986–1992. The seabed was first investigated using sub-bottom and side scan sonar. Secondly the divers went over the site with metal detectors and probes. To facilitate the excavations, the search area, measuring 26 by 36 m (85 by 118 ft), was divided into a grid system comprising boxes measuring 2 by 2 m (6 ft 7 in by 6 ft 7 in). The divers also had two giant suction devices, which sucked up sludge and clay into large sieves, where the smallest finds could be sorted. The remains of the cargo and the ship had settled during the years, together with fine clay, into a 30 to 40 cm (12 to 16 in) thick carpet, hard to penetrate. A total of 5,750 finds were registered during the excavation. Most of it was porcelain, blue and white, blue and white with brown glaze, and multicolored made to order. In addition to this the finds also consisted of tea, mother-of-pearl shells, galangal, pepper, silk fabric, ingots of "tutanego" (these contained 99% zinc, 0,5% iron) not to be confused with paktong, cannonballs, lead shots, rapier handles, sword hilts, rigging material and objects belonging to the officers and crew. When compared to the Company's cargo list, which had been preserved, the finds from the excavation made up almost 10 per cent of the original cargo.

During the excavations the thought of building a replica of the Götheborg started to form among the divers who had found the ship. The decision to excavate and rebuild the ship has generated large interest over the years from researchers, volunteers, professionals, sponsors and the public. Knowledge about 18th century history, trade with China and the Swedish East India Company has thereby increased substantially.

== Götheborg revived ==
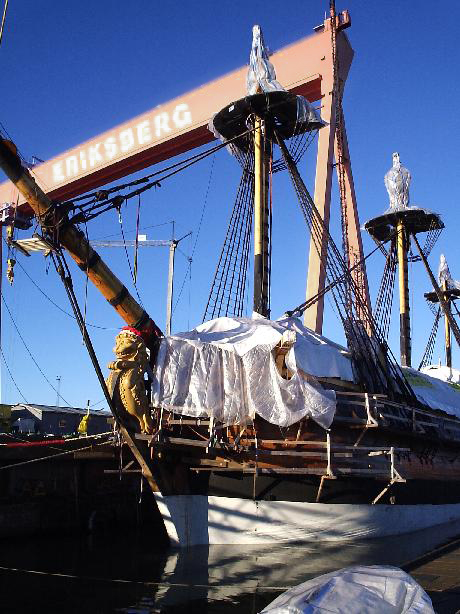
Building the Götheborg at Eriksbergs 19 December 2004

When the wreckage of the vessel Götheborg was found in 1984, the idea to make a replica of the vessel emerged. The keel for the replica was laid on 11 June 1995. This was done at the disused Eriksbergs wharf by the Göta älv in Gothenburg. Led by Master of Ceremonies Anders Wästfeldt, two silver coins, one from 1745, and one from 1995, were placed in the halved joints of the 33 m (108 ft) long keel. About 3,000 people attended the laying of the keel, including Sören Gyll, director of Volvo and professor Jorgen Weibull. The project was blessed by the vicar Alf Österholm.

The construction and historical design of the ship was made by Joakim Severinsson. The blueprints for the ship was approved by international classification society Det Norske Veritas in November 1995. All that was left of the Eriksbergs wharf were two-thirds of building berth number six, the large gantry crane and the dry dock. Around this, a new shipyard for building the Götheborg began to grow. A new ship's hull was built over the building berth, a timber workshop, a forge, a rigging workshop with a sail loft and some modern facilities such as a restaurant, offices and conference rooms were also added to the site. Since the wharf was built on reclaimed land, it seemed very apt to call it Terra Nova ("new land" in Latin) just like the wharf where the original vessel had been built.

The vessel was built using old, traditional techniques, and it was made as close to the original as possible. One small change was that the headroom of the deck was increased by 10 cm, since today's seamen are taller than their ancestors.

While the exterior remains true to the original, the interior is highly modern. The ship has an electrical system and propellers powered by diesel engines. The engines were only intended for port navigation and emergency situations, but they have been used during unfavourable wind in order to keep the timetable for the journey to China. Other enhancements include satellite navigation, communications equipment, modern facilities for the crew (kitchen, lavatories, washing machines, desalination equipment, ventilation, refrigerators), watertight bulkheads and fire protection (fire sprinkler systems, fire hydrants etc.). Most of this new technology was necessary to pass national and international safety regulations.

The vessel was launched on 6 June 2003, with great festivities and in the presence of representatives from the Swedish royal family.

Ten tons of hemp ropes were used for rigging the vessel, together with some 1,000 blocks and 1,964 m^{2} (21,140 sq ft) linen sail. All this was produced using 18th century techniques. The first trial under sail began on 18 April 2005.

=== Financing ===
At its completion in 2005, the project had cost about 250 million SEK (almost $40 million), some 40% from public funds and the rest from sponsors.

During the years the ship has been in the care of two foundations. The first foundation consisted of Volvo, SKF, Stena Line and the Port of Gothenburg among others. This foundation financed the ship up until the end of the journey to China and in 2010, its economical commitment ended. The second foundation, a non-profitable foundation, for the ship was created shortly afterwards. The business is operated by The Swedish East India Company Ltd. In January 2011, questions were raised about the future of the ship. The Gothenburg Municipality was willing to pay for the ongoing maintenance of the ship if sponsors made contributions for the expeditions and other activities. An immediate liquidation of the operation and turning the ship into a museum was also suggested. In February 2011, the future plans for the ship were postponed by the Västra Götaland Regional Council.

In August 2019, the Greencarrier Group announced they would be supporting and funding Götheborg's future sailing ventures. There are plans for the ship to sail to several different ports around the world, as well as taking part in different sailing events. There have also been talks of a new expedition to China.

== Replica ship ==
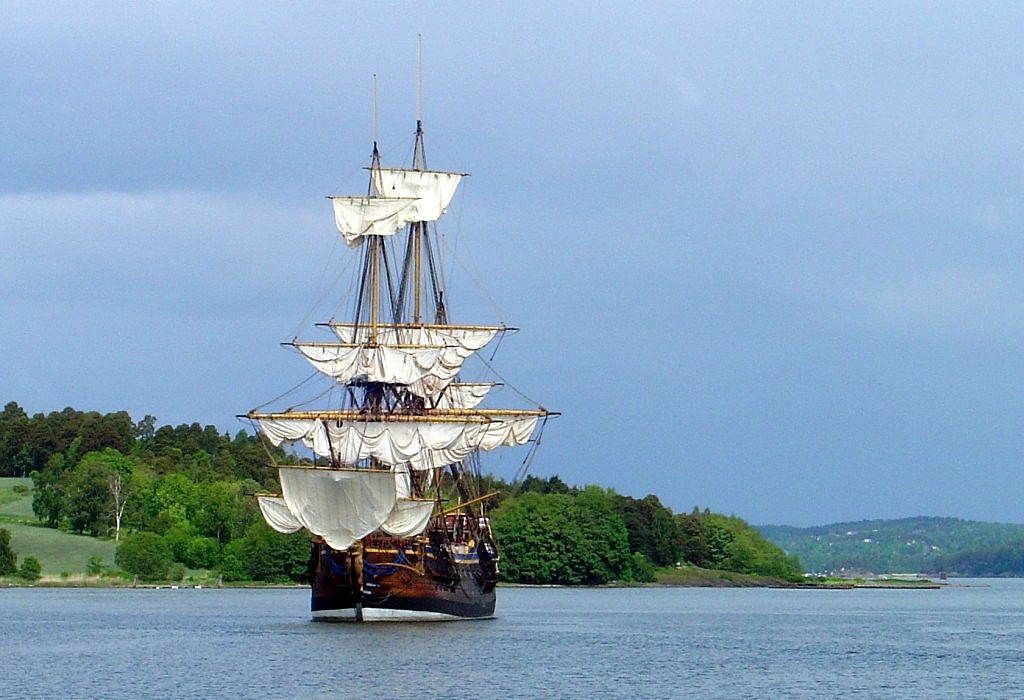
The Götheborg in Moss, Norway, 13 June 2005

=== Name ===
The correct name for the replica of the ship is the Götheborg III. It is a replica of the Götheborg (I) which sank outside Gothenburg in 1745. A second ship the Götheborg (II) was built in Gothenburg in 1786. It was the largest of all the SOIC vessels and it made three journeys to Canton: 2 February 1788–13 May 1790, 13 November 1791–12 June 1793, and on 5 December 1795, the ship sailed for Canton but was lost at Cape Town on 8 March 1796, on the way out from Gothenburg.

=== Crew ===
When leaving its home port the original ship could have over 130 crew members. Even though it was a high risk job under difficult conditions, the company did not have any problems recruiting sailors for these well paid jobs. Many of the recruits were poor young men, sons of farmers, seeking opportunity to become wealthy. The replica has a crew of 80 sailors.

=== Flag ===
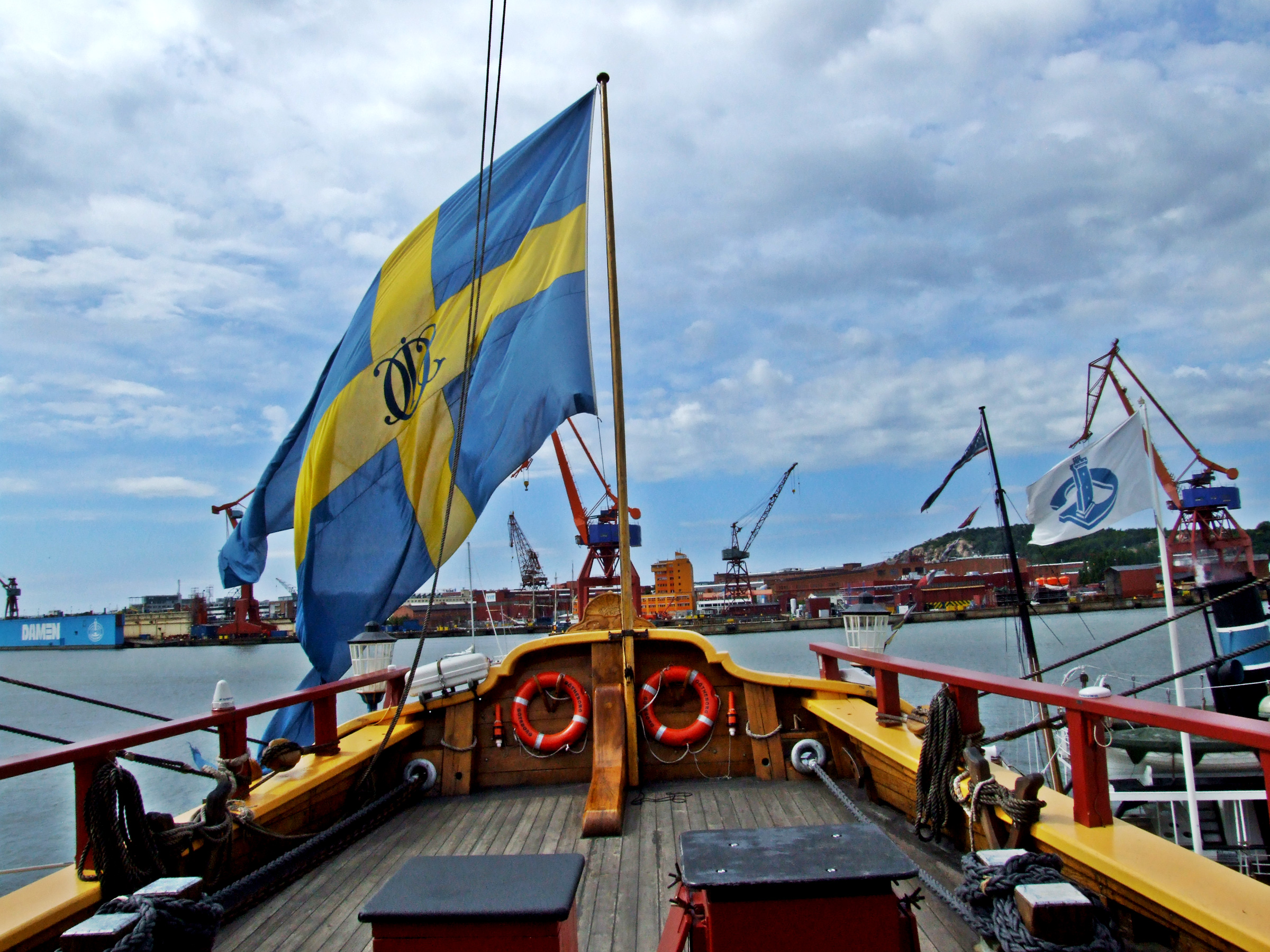
The swallowtailed SOIC flag

The East Indiaman Götheborg is classified as a passenger ship sailing under the ordinary Swedish flag. But when in port, the ship is entitled to fly the old swallowtailed version of the flag, the SOIC flag (Svenska Ostindiska Companiet, "Swedish East India Company"), that the original vessel sailed under.

The flag used on Swedish boats is the ordinary, rectangular flag. Swedish warships, or ships carrying a military commander, fly the Swedish ensign a triple-tailed or swallowtail and tongue version of the rectangular flag. The Swedish East India Company displayed a fork-tailed or swallow-tailed flag on their ships. The intention was that the ship should resemble a warship and thereby not attract pirates. This was against the rules and regulations for flags at that time. The use of the swallowtail was prohibited in a royal decree in 1751, but the SOIC ignored this and ordered their flags in Canton instead. In a memorandum to the Riksdag in 2012, a proposition was made to a grant dispensation from the prohibition. The proposition was declined and the decree is still in effect.

== Tours ==
=== Voyage to Southeast Asia and China 2005–2007 ===
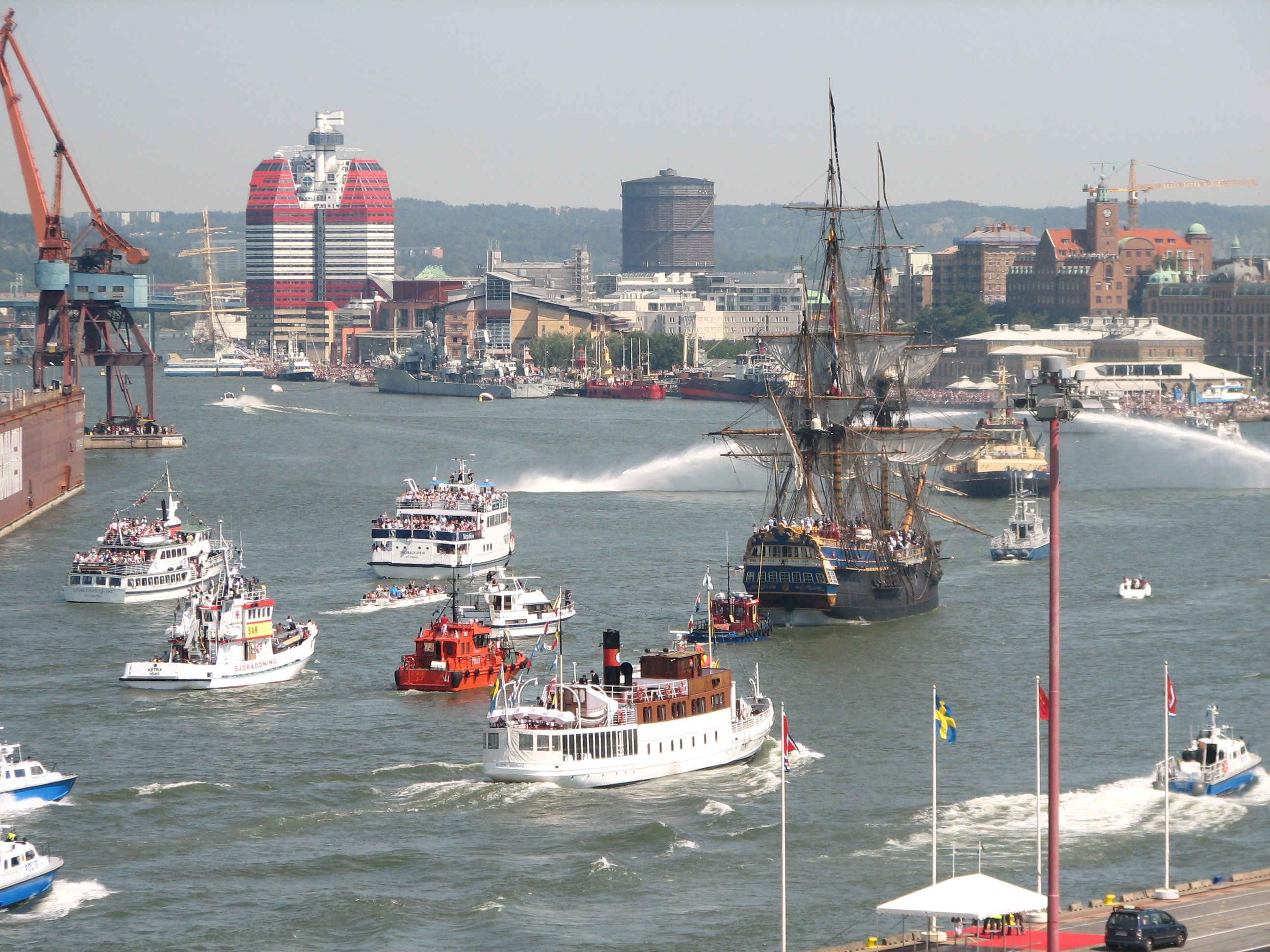
Returning home to Gothenburg

After various tests and achieving its safety certificates from Det Norske Veritas, the vessel sailed for China in October 2005, as the original vessel did, but it did not follow the same route. The vessel berthed at the Victoria and Alfred Waterfront in Cape Town, and then left for Hout Bay before continuing on its voyage. The voyage took some 18 months, and the crew of 80 were rotated during harbour stops. The vessel returned to Gothenburg on 9 June 2007, welcomed by the president of China, Hu Jintao, who visited Sweden mainly for this reason, and by the King and Queen of Sweden, Carl Gustaf and Silvia. The ship was also welcomed by thousands of private boats, and a hundred thousand spectators on shore.

Among the harbours visited were Cádiz, Recife, Cape Town, Hong Kong, Singapore and Shanghai. The total legs with cities visited and distances are listed below.

- Leg 1 – Gothenburg via Vigo to Cádiz – 2,400 nautical miles (4,400 km), ca 48 days
- Leg 2 – Cádiz to Recife – 3,100 nmi (5,700 km), ca 32 days
- Leg 3 – Recife to Cape Town – 4,200 nmi (7,800 km), ca 41 days
- Leg 4 – Cape Town via Port Elizabeth – 1,000 nmi (1,900 km), 11 days to Fremantle – 4,800 nmi (8,900 km), 49 days
- Leg 5 – Fremantle to Jakarta – 1,800 nmi (3,300 km), ca 24 days
- Leg 6 – Jakarta to Canton – 2,000 nmi (3,700 km), ca 20 days and Shanghai – 900 nmi (1,700 km), ca 12 days
- Leg 7 – Shanghai to Hong Kong – 900 nmi (1,700 km), ca 10 days and Singapore – 1,450 nmi (2,690 km), ca 21 days
- Leg 8 – Singapore to Chennai – ? nmi and Djibouti (city) – ? nmi
- Leg 9 – Djibouti via Suez Canal to Alexandria and Nice – ? nmi
- Leg 10 – Nice via Gibraltar to London – ? nmi
- Leg 11 – London to Gothenburg – ? nmi

The route to China approximately followed the original 18th-century route (around the south end of Africa), with an added detour to Australia (although in the 18th century, the ships usually avoided ports to avoid pirates). The journey home took a shortcut through the Suez Canal, which did not exist in the time of the original vessel.

=== Tours 2008–2010 ===
==== Baltic sea tours 2008 ====
Stopovers:

- (Sweden) Norrköping (22 May – 25 May)
- (Sweden) Stockholm (29 May – 6 June)
- (Finland) Helsinki (8 June – 16 June)
- (Estonia) Tallinn (17 June – 22 June)
- (Finland) Turku (24 June – 26 June)
- (Sweden) Nynäshamn (28 June – 1 July)
- (Sweden) Visby (4 July – 13 July)
- (Sweden) Norrtälje (15 July – 17 July)
- (Sweden) Gävle (18 July – 21 July)
- (Sweden) Sundsvall (23 July – 25 July)
- (Sweden) Örnsköldsvik (27 July – 29 July)
- (Sweden) Luleå (31 July – 3 August)
- (Sweden) Kalmar (15 August – 17 August)
- (Sweden) Karlskrona (22 August – 24 August)
- (Sweden) Ystad (29 August – 31 August)

==== Scandinavian tour 2009 ====
Stopovers:

- (Sweden) Marstrand (13 June – 14 June)
- (Norway) Arendal (19 June – 21 June)
- (Denmark) Frederikshavn (26 June – 28 June)
- (Norway) Sandefjord (1 July – 3 July)
- (Norway) Stavern (4 July – 5 July)
- (Norway) Ålesund (10 July – 12 July)
- (Norway) Stavanger (15 July – 17 July)
- (Norway) Farsund (19 July – 21 July)
- (Norway) Halden (23 July – 25 July)
- (Sweden) Lysekil (27 July – 1 August)
- (Sweden) Halmstad (2 August – 3 August)
- (Norway) Risør (6 August – 9 August)
- (Sweden) Gothenburg (11 August – 7 September)
- (Sweden) Strömstad (9 September)

==== Summer tour 2010 ====
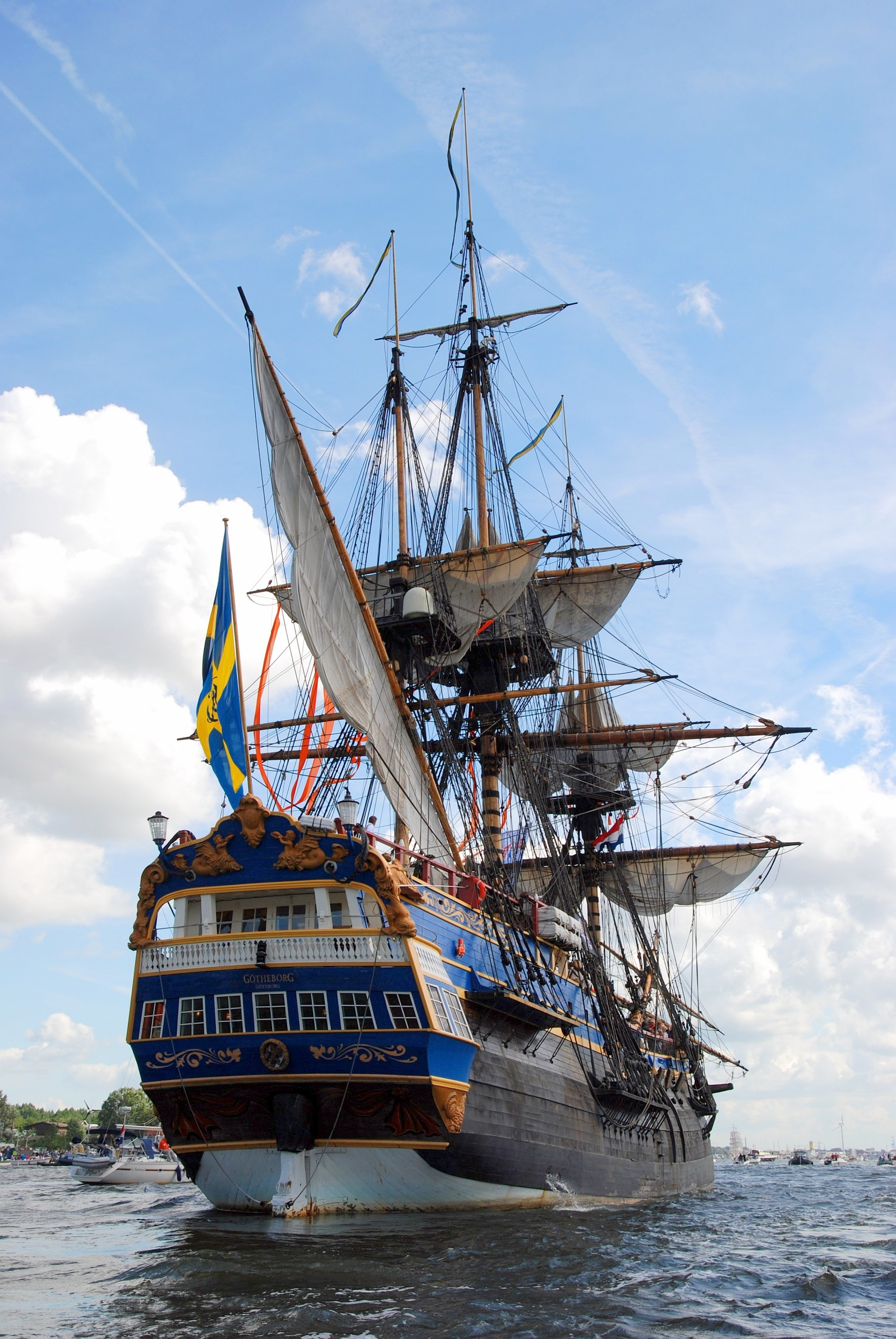
Stern view at SAIL Amsterdam 2010.

Stopovers:

- (Sweden) Stockholm (14 June – 20 June)
- (Denmark) Frederikshavn (26 June – 28 June)
- (Netherlands) Amsterdam (19 August – 23 August)
- (Germany) Bremerhaven (25 August – 29 August)

=== Tours 2012–2014 ===
==== European Tour 2012 ====
Stopovers:

- (Sweden) Gothenburg (30 June)
- (Netherlands) Den Helder (5 July – 7 July)
- (France) Brest (13 July – 19 July)
- (Germany) Bremerhaven (25 July – 29 July)
- (Sweden) Gothenburg (3 August)

==== European Tour 2013 ====
Stopovers:

- (Sweden) Gothenburg (6 May)
- (Norway) Tønsberg (8 May – 10 May)
- (Norway) Moss (11 May – 13 May)
- (Norway) Oslo (14 May – 19 May)
- (Sweden) Landskrona (24 May – 26 May)
- (France) Rouen (6 June – 16 June)
- (Netherlands) Den Helder (27 June – 30 June)
- (Germany) Kiel (20 June – 23 June)
- (Denmark) Århus (4 July – 7 July)
- (Finland) Helsinki (17 July – 20 July)
- (Latvia) Riga (25 July – 28 July)
- (Poland) Szczecin (3 August – 6 August)
- (Sweden) Visby (9 August – 11 August)
- (Sweden) Örnsköldsvik (16 August – 18 August)
- (Sweden) Luleå (22 August – 25 August)
- (Sweden) Norrtälje (30 August – 1 September)
- (Sweden) Gothenburg (7 September)

== Stamps ==
The Swedish postal service issued four stamps depicting the Götheborg on 4 October 2003.

== Gallery ==
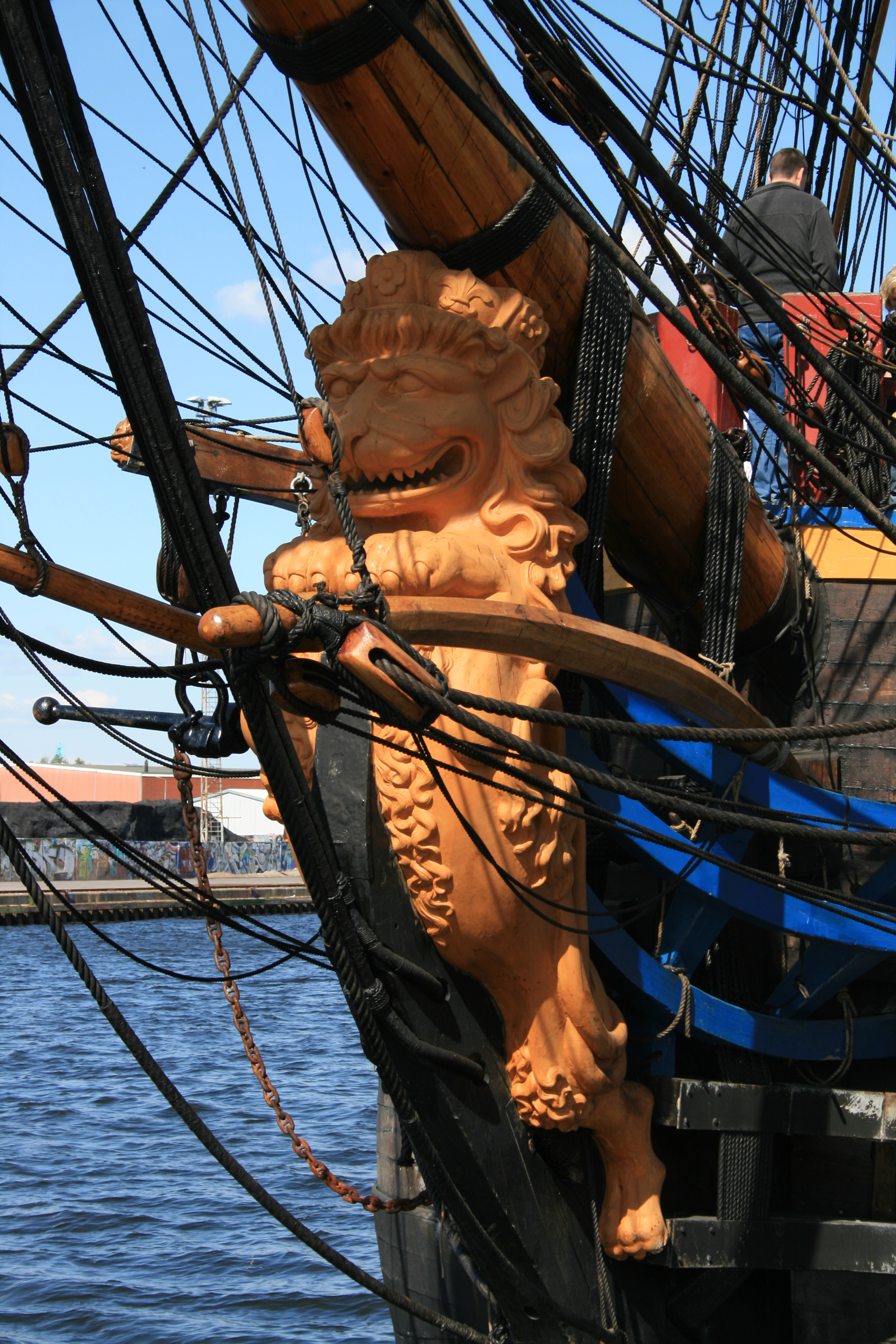
The figurehead, a two tailed lion carved by Andy Peters

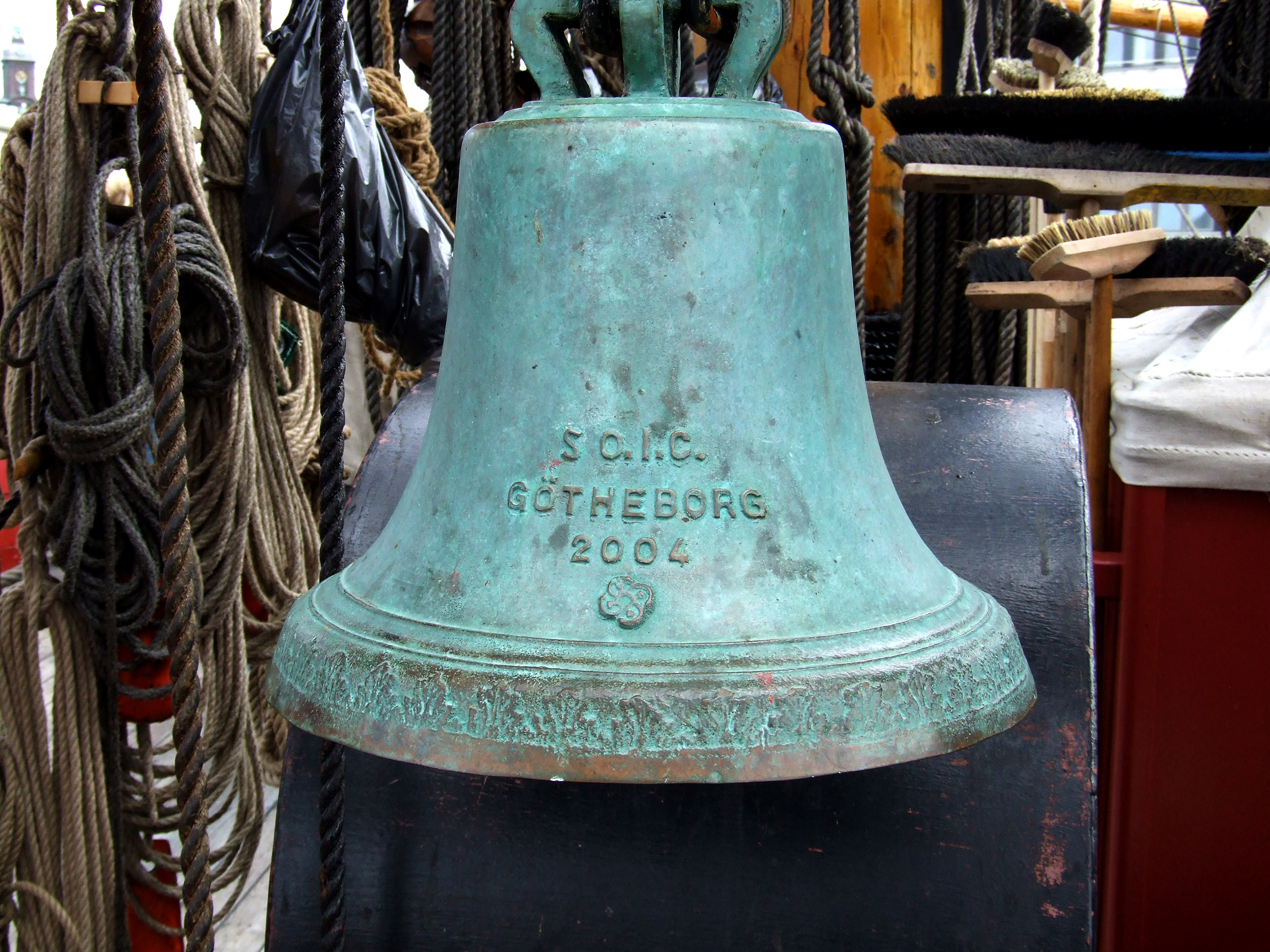
The ship's bell, cast to resemble the ship's bell on the East Indiaman "Enigheten"

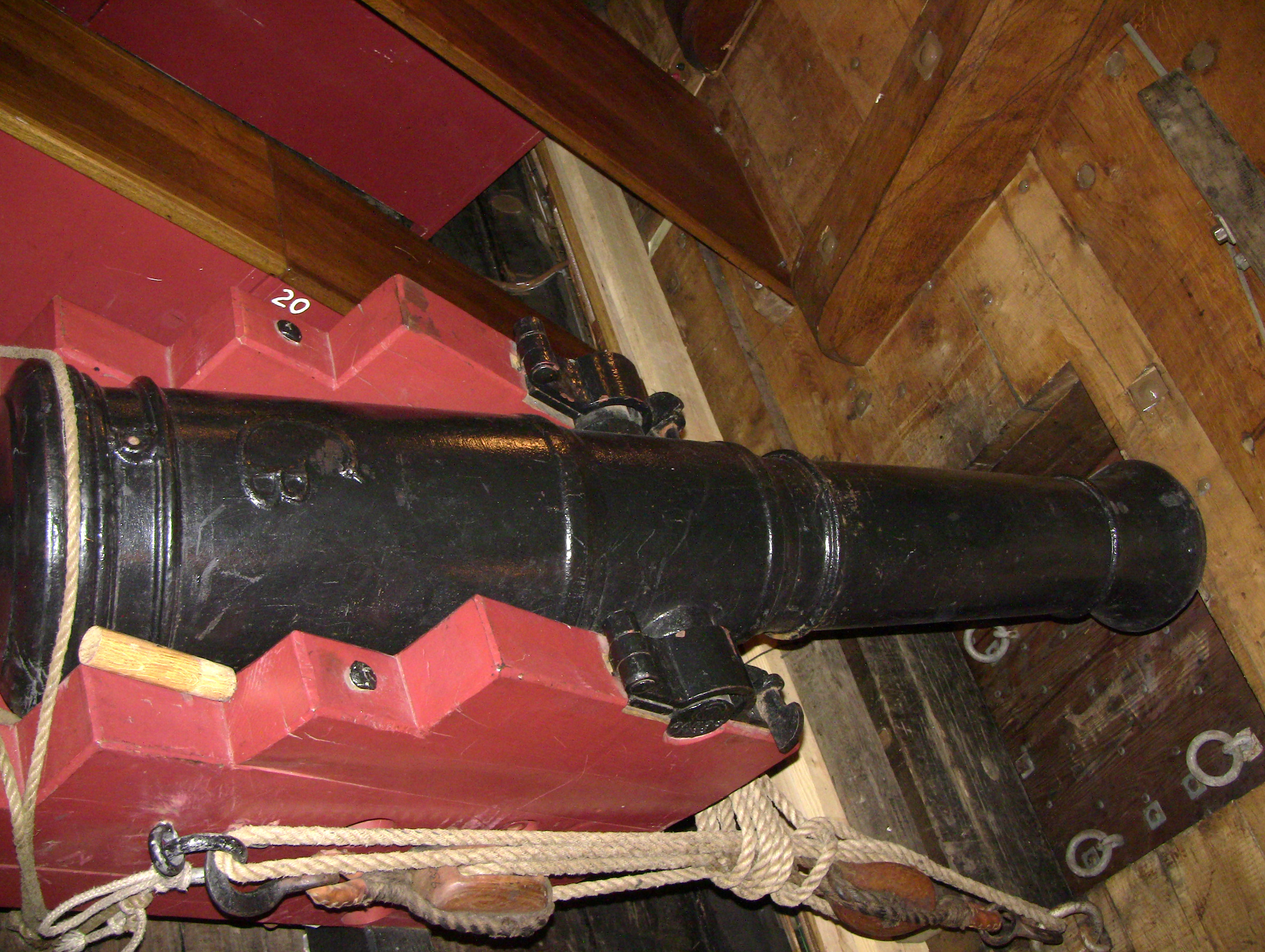
One of the ten new, six-pound, cast-iron cannons

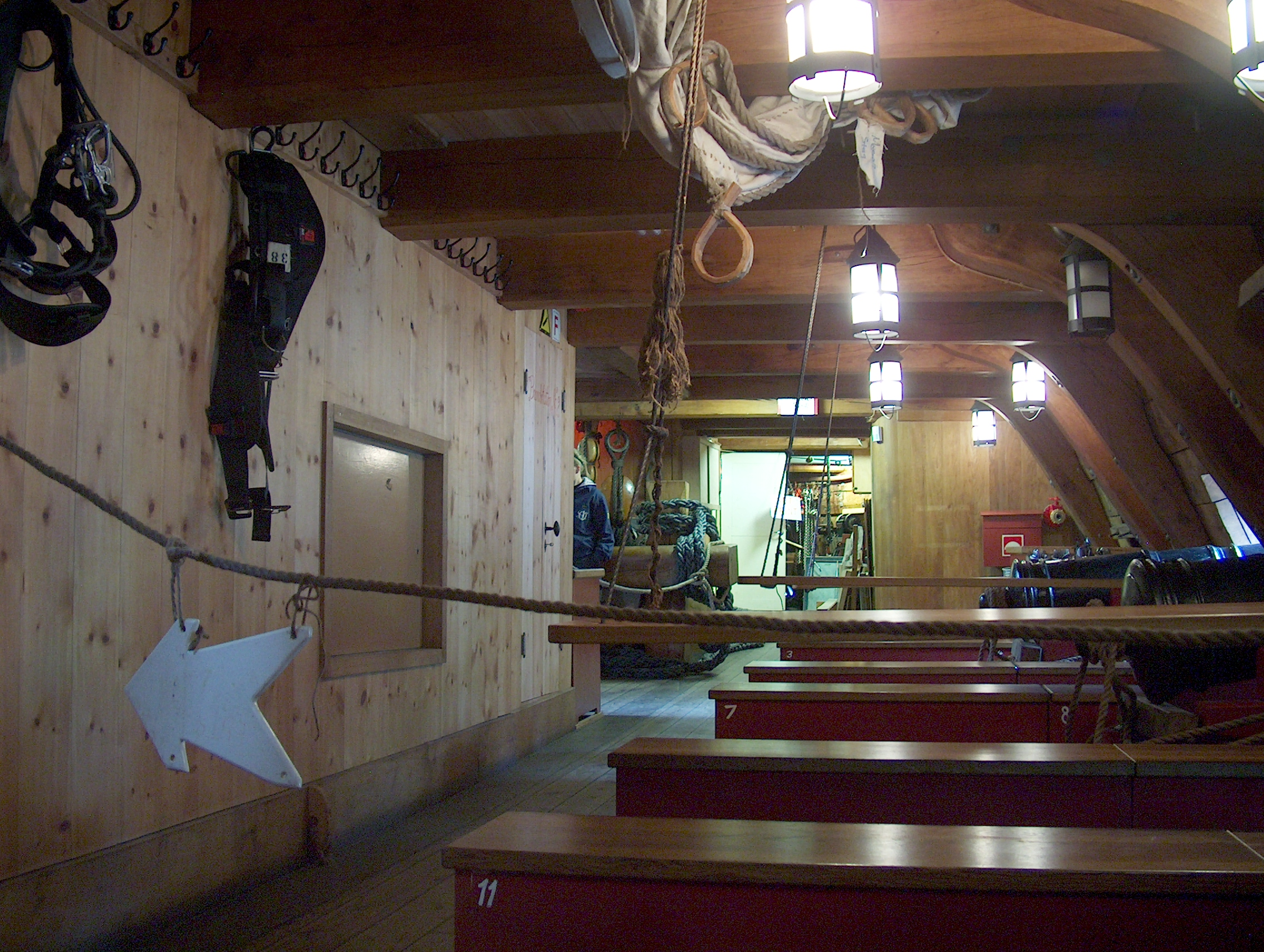
Inside the ship

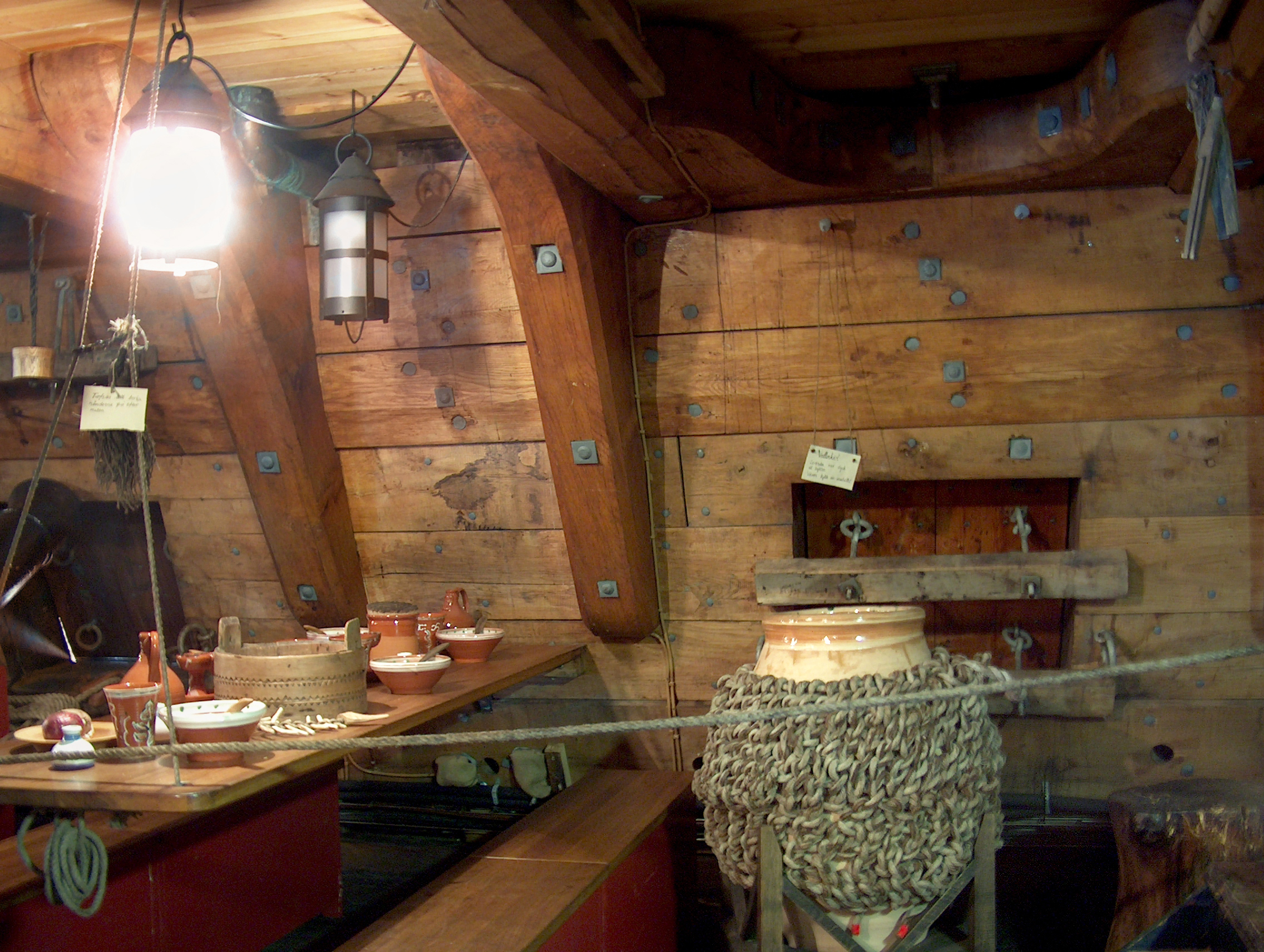
Recreated 18th-century dining area

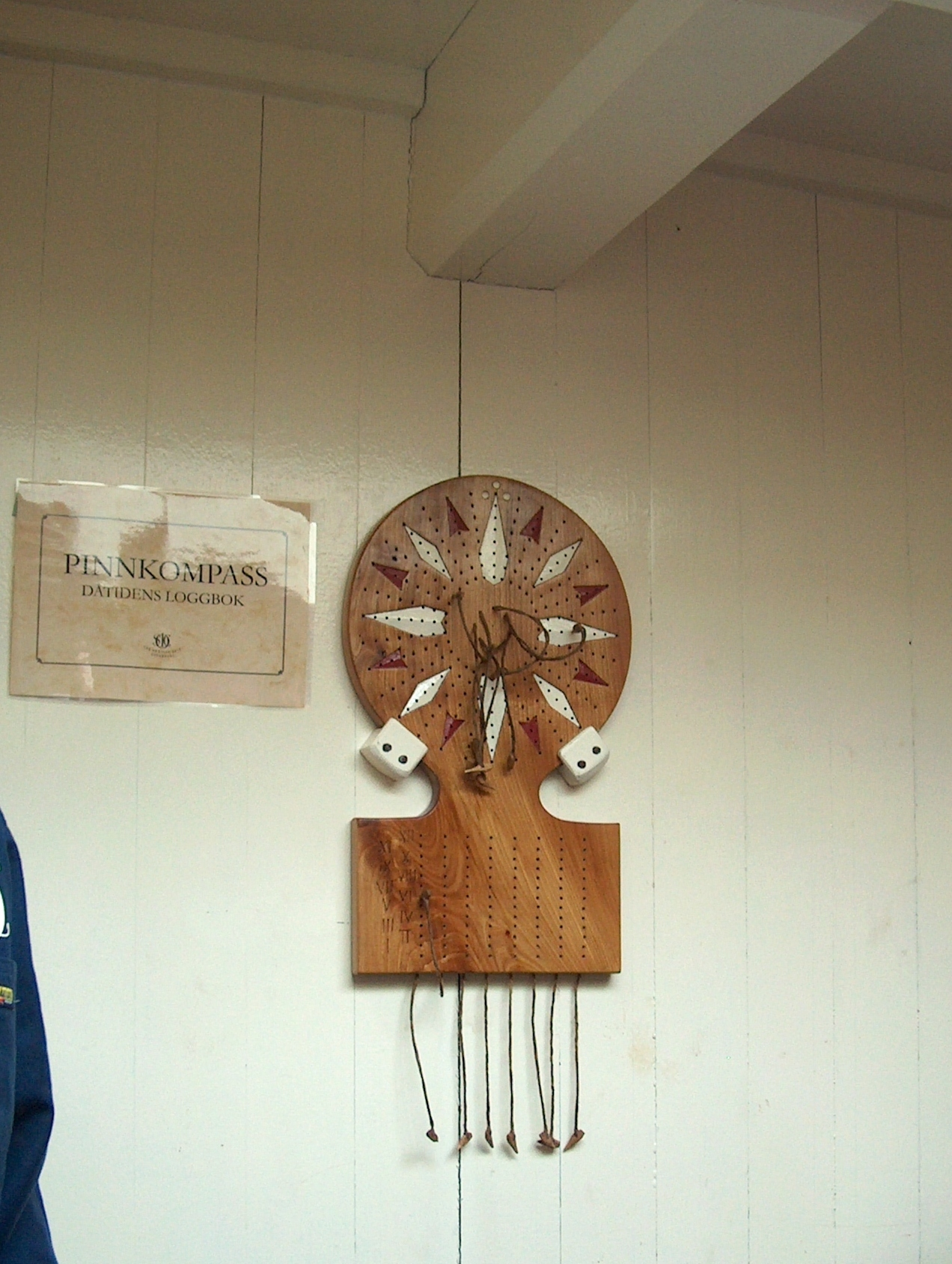
Pin compass with distance chart

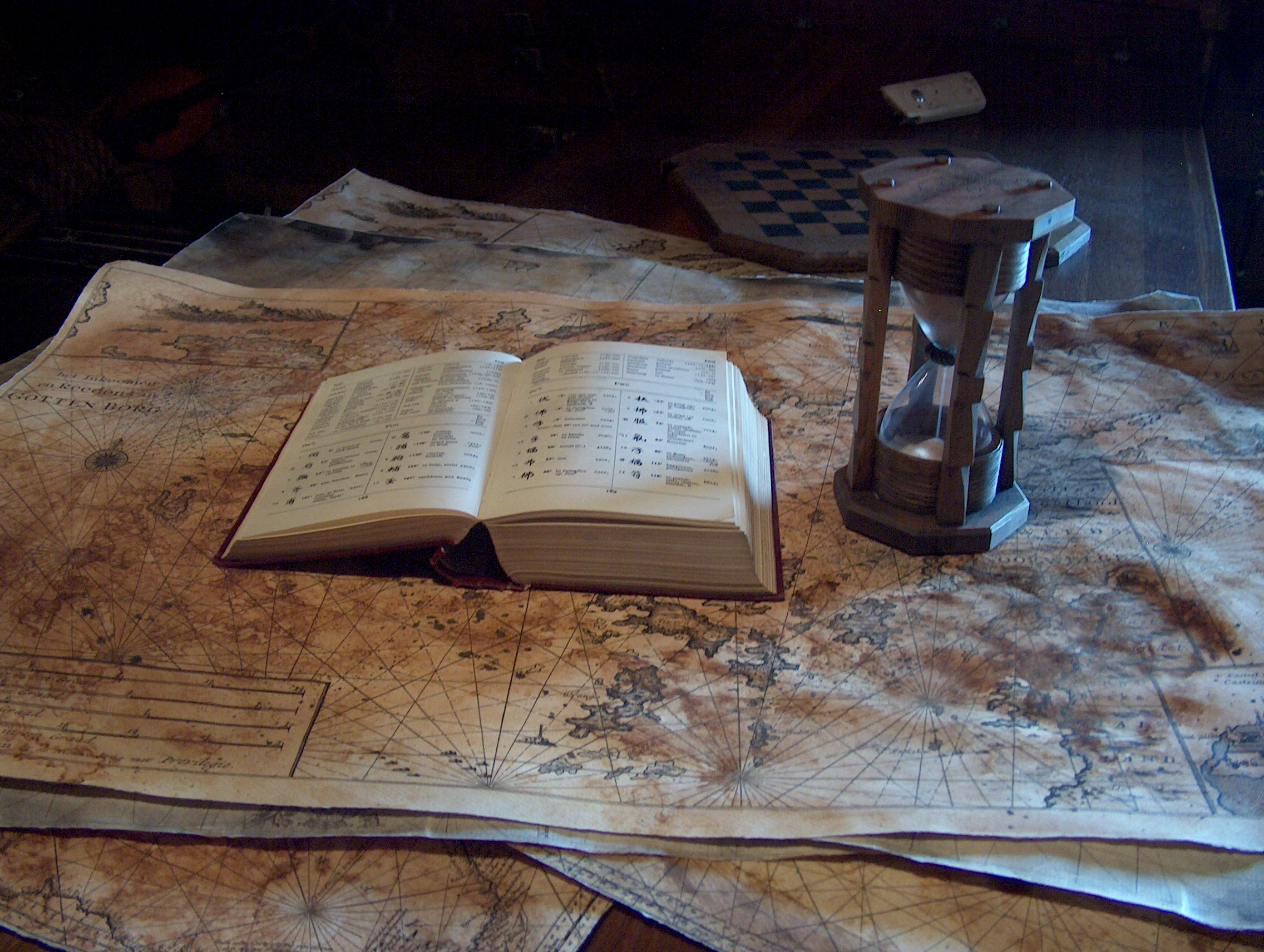
Replicas of maps and logs

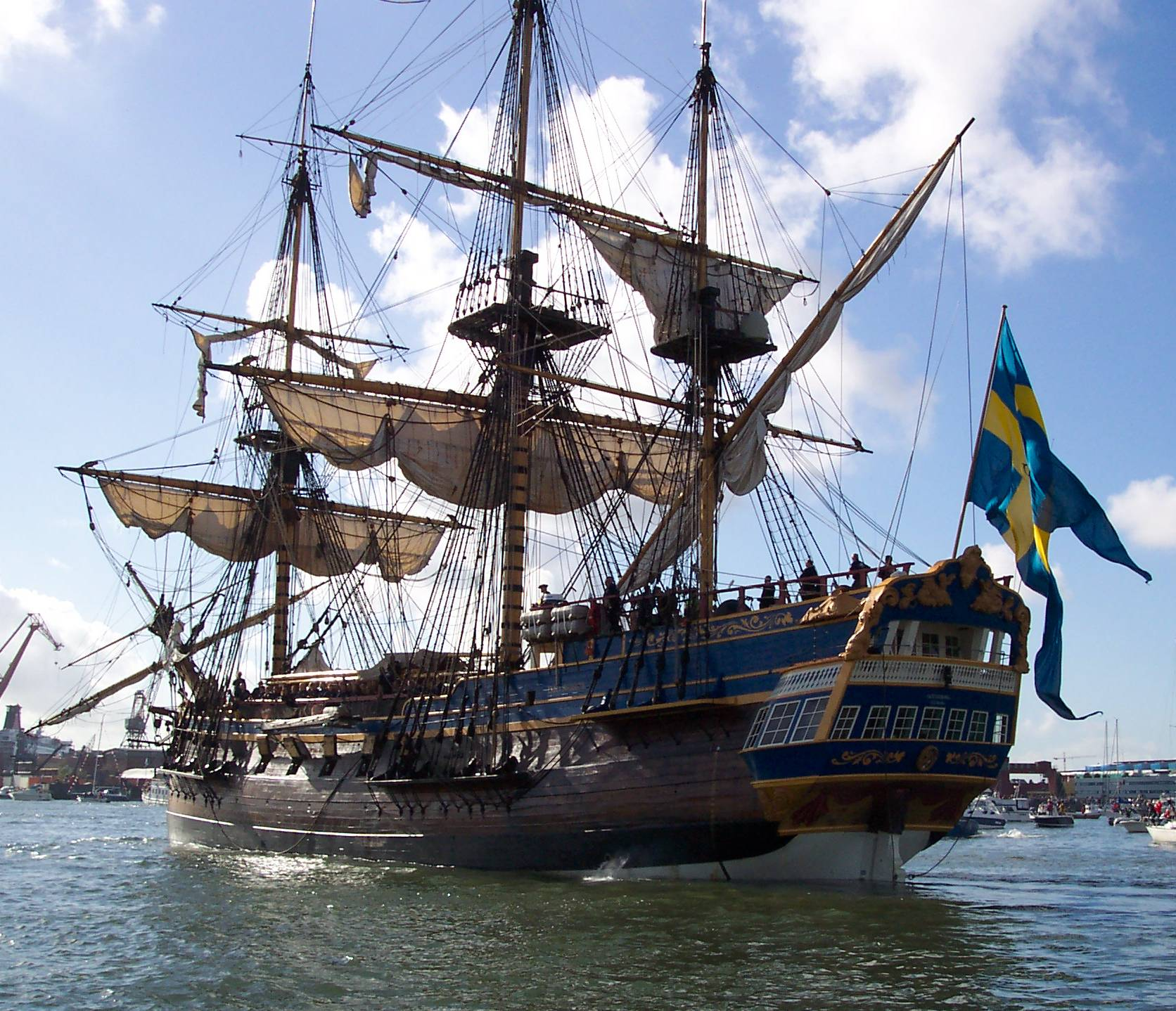
The East Indiaman Götheborg replica of the original ship leaving Gothenburg for China, 2 October 2005

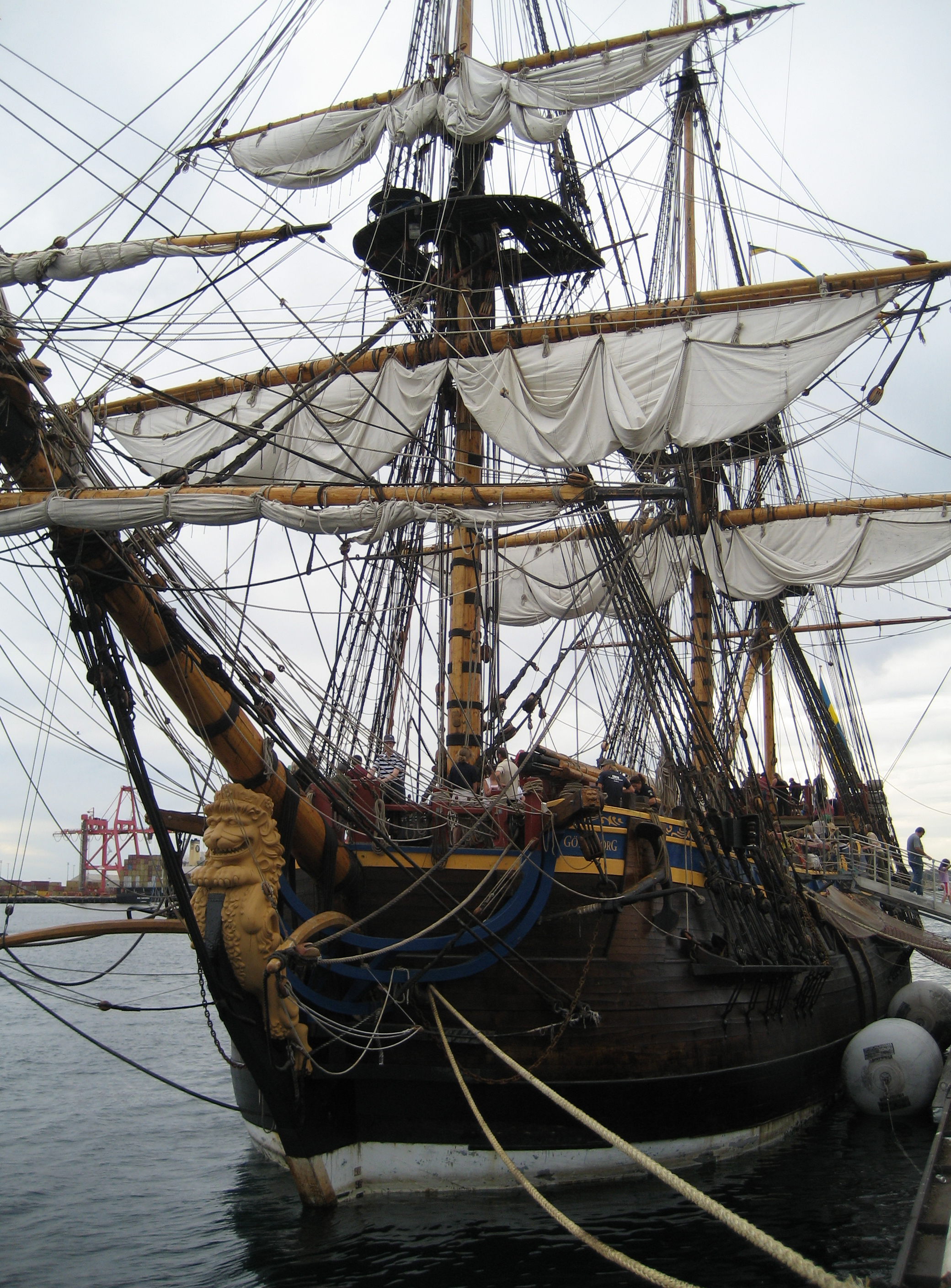
The Götheborg berthed in Fremantle, Western Australia, harbor, 14 May 2006

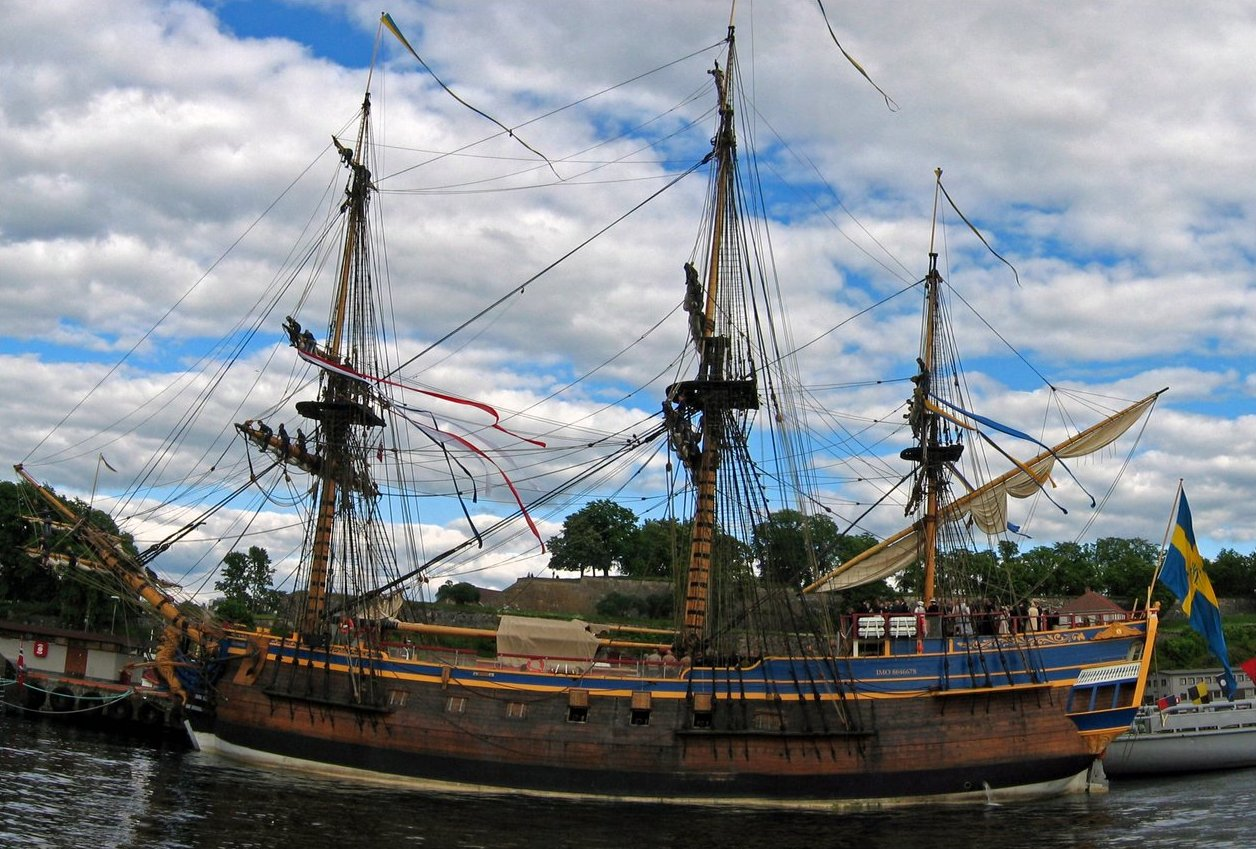
Götheborg in Oslo for the centennial celebration of the dissolution of the Norway–Sweden Union, 10 June 2005

=== Götheborg and Swedish navy ships in Stockholm ===
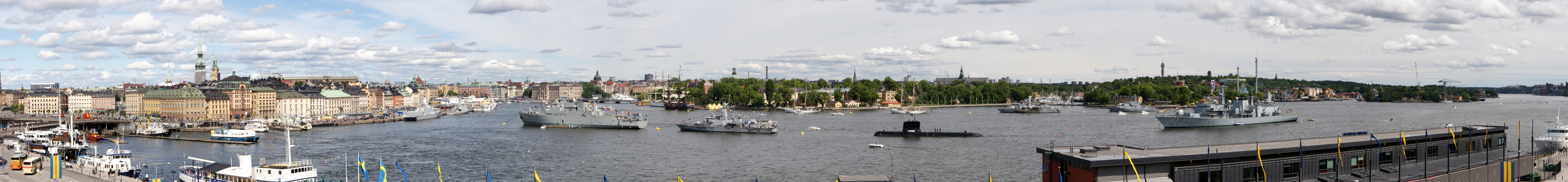
Ships on the Saltsjön, with Götheborg docked in the center, in Stockholm on the day of the wedding of Crown Princess Victoria of Sweden to Daniel Westling, 19 June 2010

== Contemporaries ==
The yacht Creole is the longest wooden sailing yacht still sailed, at 63.7 meters long. Other large wooden sailing vessels that are still sailed in include the SV Tenacious (65 meters long to the bowsprit) and USS Constitution; between these the exact superlative quality depends on the exact criteria between the Tenacious, Creole,Constitution, and Götheborg that is being measured.

The Constitution is substantially larger than the others at 304 ft (93 m) bowsprit to spanker, and over 1570 tons displacement.

Some related mentions would include the C.A. Thayer (1895), HMS Victory, and HDMS Jylland, which are more or less static museum ships with wooden hulls.

== See also ==
- List of the longest wooden ships
- List of large sailing vessels
- Ship replica (including a list of ship replicas)
- French frigate Hermione, a replica of the 1779 Hermione which achieved fame by ferrying General Lafayette to the United States in 1780, to allow him to join the American side in the American Revolutionary War
- Kalmar Nyckel, a replica of the 17th-century merchant ship that brought Swedes to "New Sweden", the first Swedish colony in America.
- HM Bark Endeavour, a replica of the 18th-century bark commanded by Lieutenant James Cook
- SV Tenacious, another large wooden ship of this period
- Vasa (ship), preserved historic Swedish warship of the 1620s
