= Gabriele von Bülow =

German noblewoman

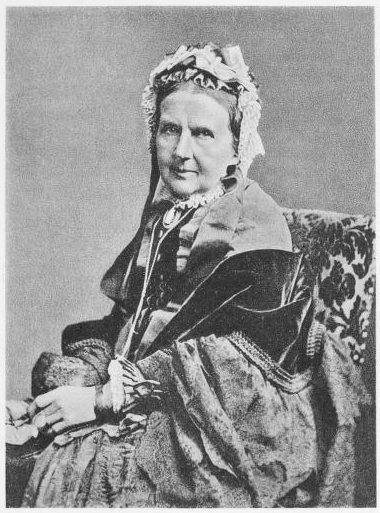
- Gabriele von Bülow, ca. 1880
- Born: 28 May 1802; Berlin, Kingdom of Prussia
- Died: 16 April 1887 (aged 84); Berlin, German Empire
- Spouse: Heinrich von Bülow
- Issue: Gabriele; Adelheid; Caroline; Therese; Constanze; Wilhelm; Bernhard Hans
- Father: Wilhelm von Humboldt
- Mother: Caroline von Dacheröden

Gabriele von Bülow (28 May 1802 – 16 April 1887) was a German noblewoman.

== Life ==
The third daughter of Wilhelm von Humboldt and Caroline von Dacheröden, she was born in Berlin. She had seven sisters and spent her early years in Rome at her father's ambassadorial residence, remaining there even after his return to Berlin – in 1809 her portrait was painted in Rome by Gottlieb Schick. In 1810 the children and Caroline moved to Vienna, where Wilhelm acted as ambassador until 1814. The family then moved to Berlin for two years then to Frankfurt am Main.

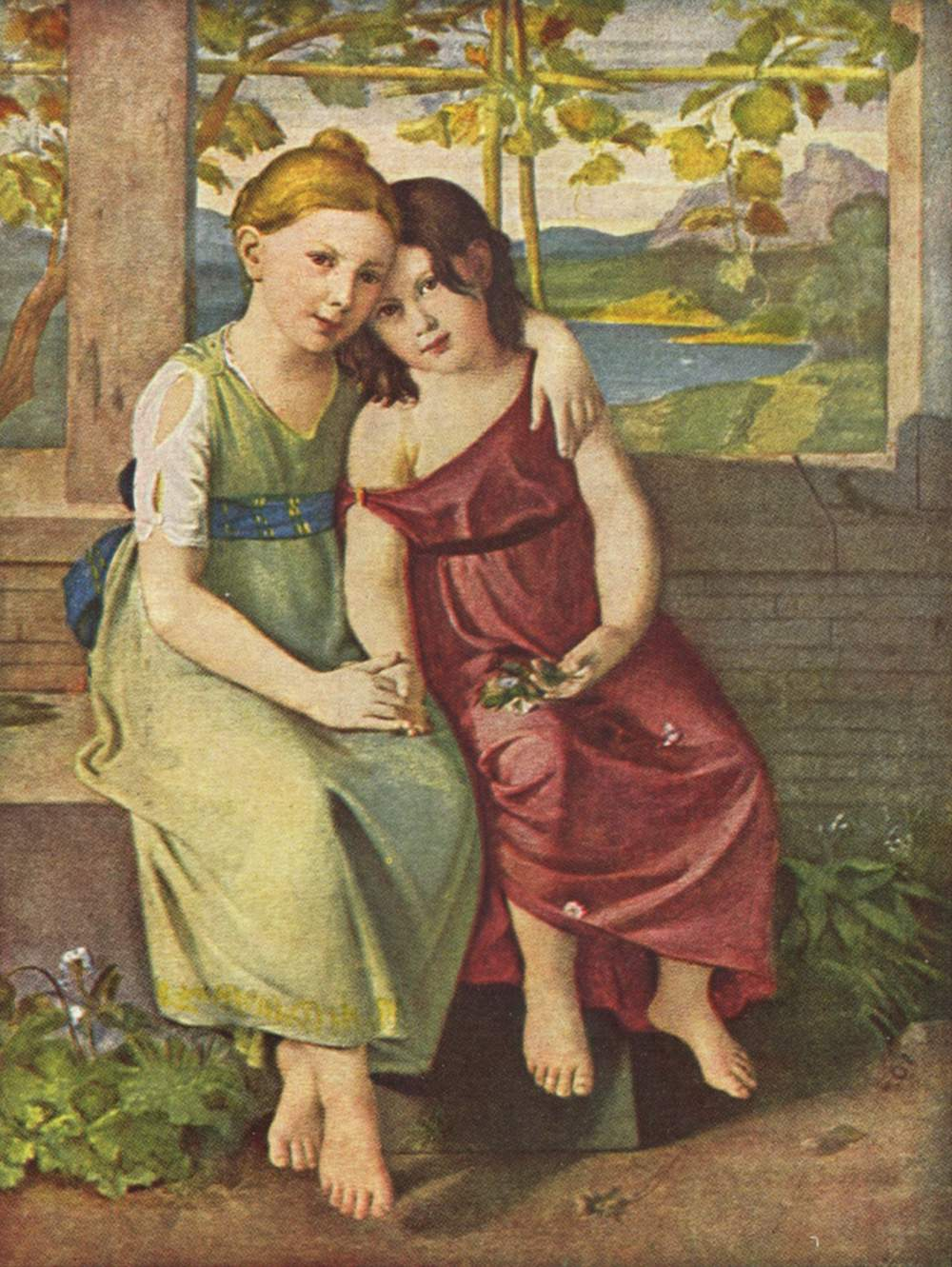
Gabriele von Humboldt aged seven (right) with her sister Adelheid, to whom she was particularly close.

On 30 October 1816 Gabriele became engaged to her father's secretary Heinrich von Bülow, though the marriage only occurred years later. Gabriele spent two more years in Rome and in 1819 she returned to Berlin. Bülow returned from London in 1820 and they married on 10 January 1821. As a successful diplomat, Bülow spent most of his life in London – he was appointed ambassador in 1827. Gabriele spent 1828 to 1836 in London with her husband, where her portrait was painted by August Grahl in 1831. She also spent long periods back home around the deaths of her parents in 1829 and 1835, especially the several years she spent caring for her father at Schloss Tegel.

Bülow became Prussia's foreign minister in 1842 but died in 1846. Gabriele moved to Potsdam then to Rome, looking after her children and grandchildren. Although she was the last surviving heir of her father, particularly to his estates in Tegel and Burgörner, she lived a very modest life, in contrast to her mother, though still in contact with major figures of her time – for example, she acted as chief lady in waiting to William I's consort Augusta at William's coronation. Her 81st birthday in 1883 was chosen as the occasion for unveiling the two Humboldt monuments in front of the University of Berlin. She was also a patron to the writer and salon-leader Marie von Olfers, whilst the Gabriele von Bülow Oberschule in Berlin was named after her in 1938.

She died in Berlin on 16 April 1887.

== Children ==
She and Heinrich von Bülow had seven children;

- Gabriele (7 January 1822 – 16 February 1854), married Leopold von Loën (1815–1895) on 29 August 1842
- Adelheid (16 October 1823 – 21 December 1889), died unmarried
- Caroline (27 February 1826 – 19 November 1887), died unmarried
- Therese (15 August 1829 – 20 July 1841)
- Constanze (10 April 1832 – 1920), married Carl von Heinz (1818–1867) on 17 January 1857
- Wilhelm (12 May 1836 – 6 September 1836)
- Bernhard Hans (8 June 1838 – 17 October 1889), married Anna Luise Emilie of Byern (1847–1931) on 28 September 1865

== Bibliography ==
- (in German) Sydow, Anna von (ed.): Gabriele von Bülow. Tochter Wilhelm von Humboldts. Ein Lebensbild aus den Familienpapieren Wilhelm von Humboldts und seiner Kinder 1791–1887. Mittler &.Sohn, Berlin 1913.
- (in German) Antonius Lux (ed.): Große Frauen der Weltgeschichte. 1000 Biographien in Wort und Bild. Sebastian Lux Verlag, München 1963, S. 87.
