= Herder-Gymnasium Minden =

School in Minden, Germany

Coordinates: 52.2912°N 8.9096°E

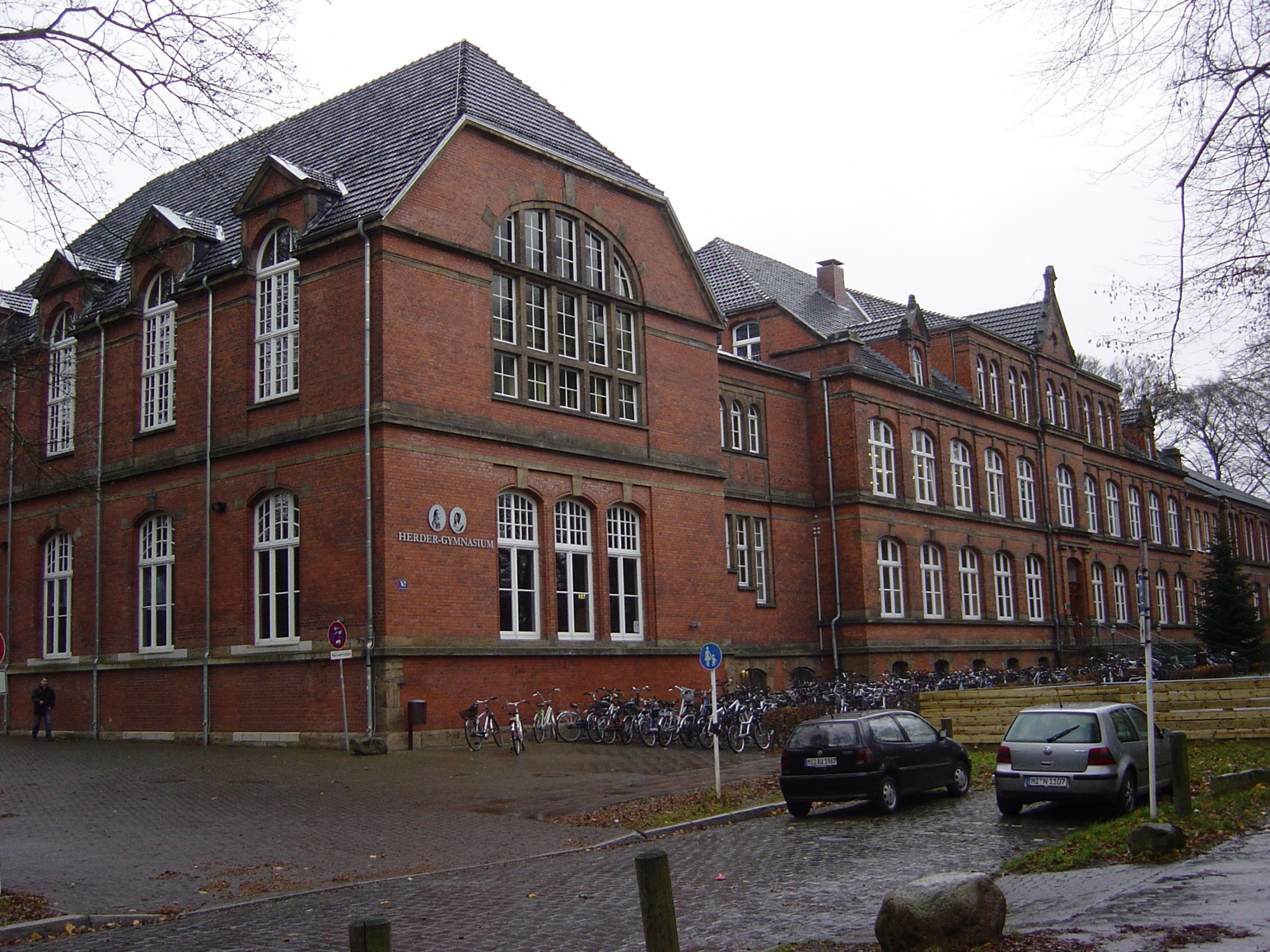

Information
- Other name: Herder-Gymnasium Minden mit Caroline−von–Humboldt–Gymnasium
- Former name: Städtischen neusprachlichen Gymnasiums für Jungen und Mädchen (1964-1967)
- Established: 1964; 62 years ago
- Website: www.herder-gymnasium-minden.de

The Herder-Gymnasium is a gymnasium in the German city of Minden. It is one of three gymnasium schools in the city. Founded in 1964 as the Städtischen neusprachlichen Gymnasiums für Jungen und Mädchen, it was renamed three years later after the theologian Johann Gottfried Herder.

Its full name is the Herder-Gymnasium Minden mit Caroline−von–Humboldt–Gymnasium, reflecting its 1989 merger with the Caroline-von-Humboldt-Gymnasium, founded in 1826 and named after Caroline von Humboldt, wife of the diplomat Wilhelm.
