= Baruth/Mark =

- Town
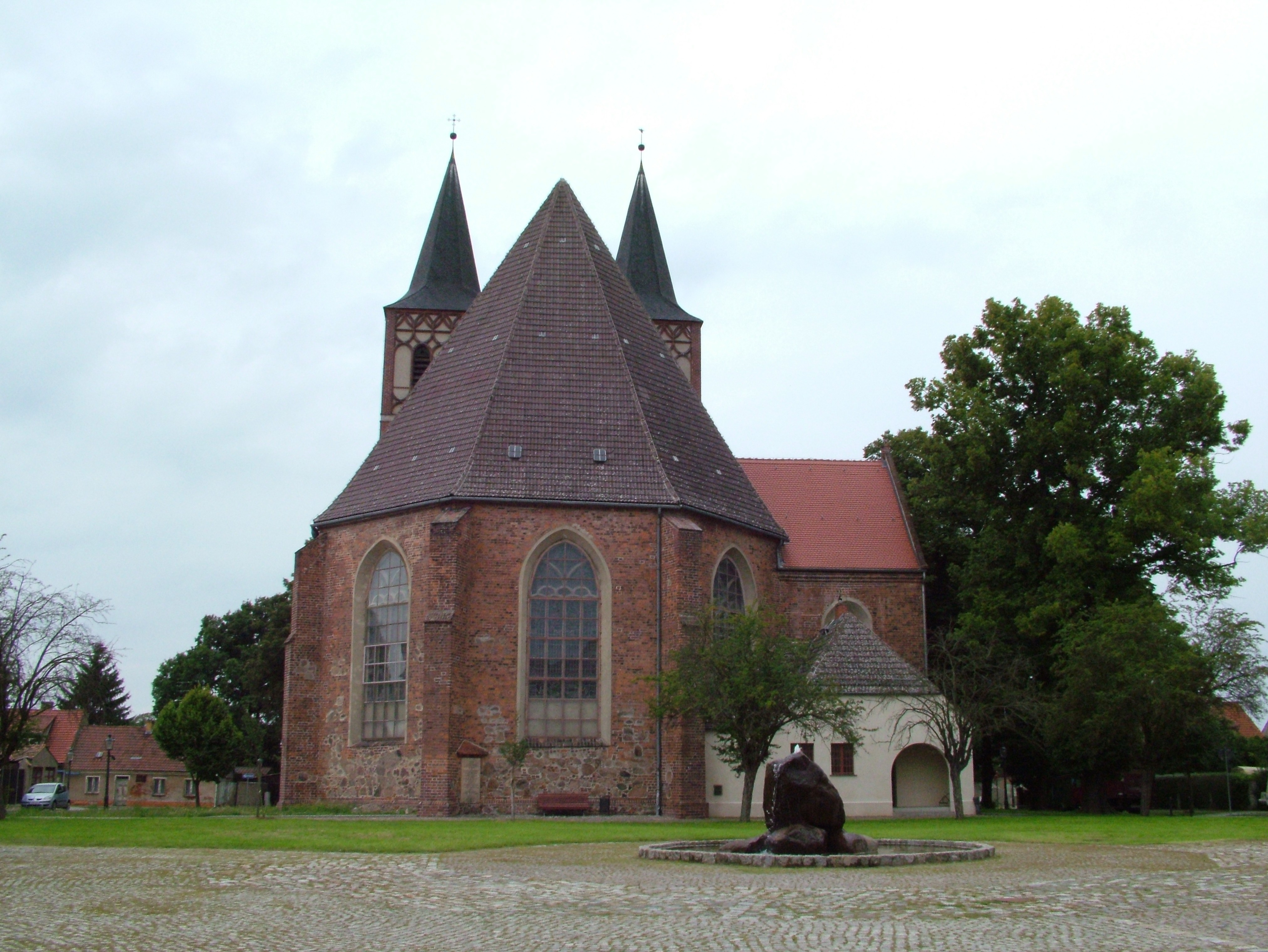
- Saint Sebastian parish church

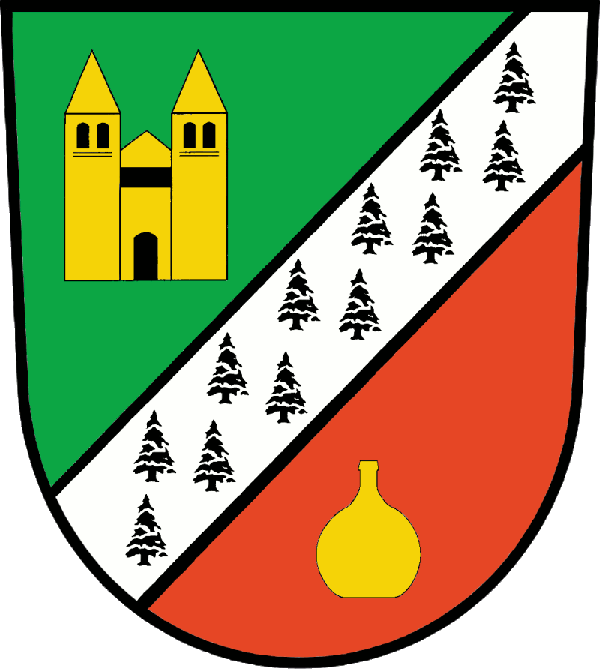
- Coat of arms

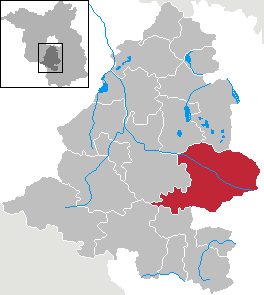
- Location of Baruth/Mark within Teltow-Fläming district
- Interactive map of Baruth/Mark
- Location within Germany Location within Brandenburg
- Coordinates: 52°03′N 13°30′E
- Country: Germany
- State: Brandenburg
- District: Teltow-Fläming
- Subdivisions: 12 Ortsteile bzw. Stadtbezirke

Government
  - Mayor (2018–26): Peter Ilk

Area
  - Total: 233.83 km^{2} (90.28 sq mi)
- Elevation: 51–145 m (167–476 ft)

Population (2025-12-31)
  - Total: 4,119
  - Density: 17.62/km^{2} (45.62/sq mi)
- Time zone: UTC+01:00 (CET)
  - Summer (DST): UTC+02:00 (CEST)
- Postal codes: 15837
- Dialling codes: 033704
- Vehicle registration: TF
- Website: www.stadt-baruth-mark.de

Baruth/Mark (German pronunciation: [ˈbaːʁuːt]) is a town in the Teltow-Fläming district of Brandenburg, Germany. It is situated 24 km east of Luckenwalde, and 53 km south of Berlin.

== Geography ==
Baruth/Mark is structured in the following parts of town, which are all villages and mainly former municipalities:

- Baruth/Mark
  - Klein Ziescht
- Dornswalde
- Groß Ziescht
  - Kemlitz
- Horstwalde
- Klasdorf
  - Glashütte
- Ließen
- Merzdorf
- Mückendorf
- Paplitz
- Petkus
  - Charlottenfelde
- Radeland
- Schöbendorf

== Demography ==
Development of Population since 1875 within the Current Boundaries (Blue Line: Population; Dotted Line: Comparison to Population Development of Brandenburg state; Grey Background: Time of Nazi rule; Red Background: Time of Communist rule)

Recent Population Development and Projections (Population Development before Census 2011 (blue line); Recent Population Development according to the Census in Germany in 2011 (blue bordered line); Official projections for 2005-2030 (yellow line); for 2017-2030 (scarlet line); for 2020-2030 (green line)

Baruth/Mark: Population development
within the current boundaries (2020)

Year	Pop.	±% p.a.
1875	6,513	—
1890	6,508	−0.01%
1910	6,458	−0.04%
1925	6,312	−0.15%
1939	6,149	−0.19%
1950	7,687	+2.05%
1964	5,974	−1.78%

Year	Pop.	±% p.a.
1971	5,620	−0.87%
1981	5,229	−0.72%
1985	5,155	−0.36%
1990	4,926	−0.90%
1995	4,699	−0.94%
2000	4,651	−0.21%
2005	4,437	−0.94%

Year	Pop.	±% p.a.
2010	4,174	−1.21%
2015	4,146	−0.13%
2016	4,121	−0.60%
2017	4,137	+0.39%
2018	4,200	+1.52%
2019	4,217	+0.40%
2020	4,225	+0.19%

== Climate ==
Climate data for Baruth (1991–2020 normals)
Month	Jan	Feb	Mar	Apr	May	Jun	Jul	Aug	Sep	Oct	Nov	Dec	Year
Mean daily maximum °C (°F)	3.5 (38.3)	5.4 (41.7)	9.5 (49.1)	16.0 (60.8)	20.4 (68.7)	24.0 (75.2)	25.7 (78.3)	25.0 (77.0)	20.5 (68.9)	14.6 (58.3)	8.7 (47.7)	4.7 (40.5)	14.8 (58.6)
Daily mean °C (°F)	0.8 (33.4)	1.8 (35.2)	4.5 (40.1)	9.5 (49.1)	14.0 (57.2)	17.5 (63.5)	19.4 (66.9)	18.5 (65.3)	14.4 (57.9)	9.7 (49.5)	5.4 (41.7)	2.3 (36.1)	9.9 (49.8)
Mean daily minimum °C (°F)	−2.4 (27.7)	−1.9 (28.6)	−0.4 (31.3)	2.4 (36.3)	6.6 (43.9)	10.3 (50.5)	12.6 (54.7)	11.8 (53.2)	8.3 (46.9)	5.0 (41.0)	1.8 (35.2)	−0.8 (30.6)	4.4 (39.9)
Average precipitation mm (inches)	42.7 (1.68)	32.6 (1.28)	38.3 (1.51)	29.6 (1.17)	53.1 (2.09)	50.4 (1.98)	79.1 (3.11)	58.0 (2.28)	45.1 (1.78)	40.5 (1.59)	43.1 (1.70)	41.6 (1.64)	558.7 (22.00)
Average precipitation days (≥ 0.1 mm)	16.3	14.0	15.0	10.9	12.6	13.1	13.3	12.6	11.6	13.3	14.8	16.8	164.0
Average relative humidity (%)	85.1	81.0	75.9	68.0	67.4	67.6	69.0	71.1	76.4	82.9	87.1	85.9	76.3
Mean monthly sunshine hours	54.7	78.5	128.0	200.8	223.3	228.0	234.3	218.8	174.1	115.8	64.6	48.9	1,814.2
Source: NOAA

== Photogallery ==
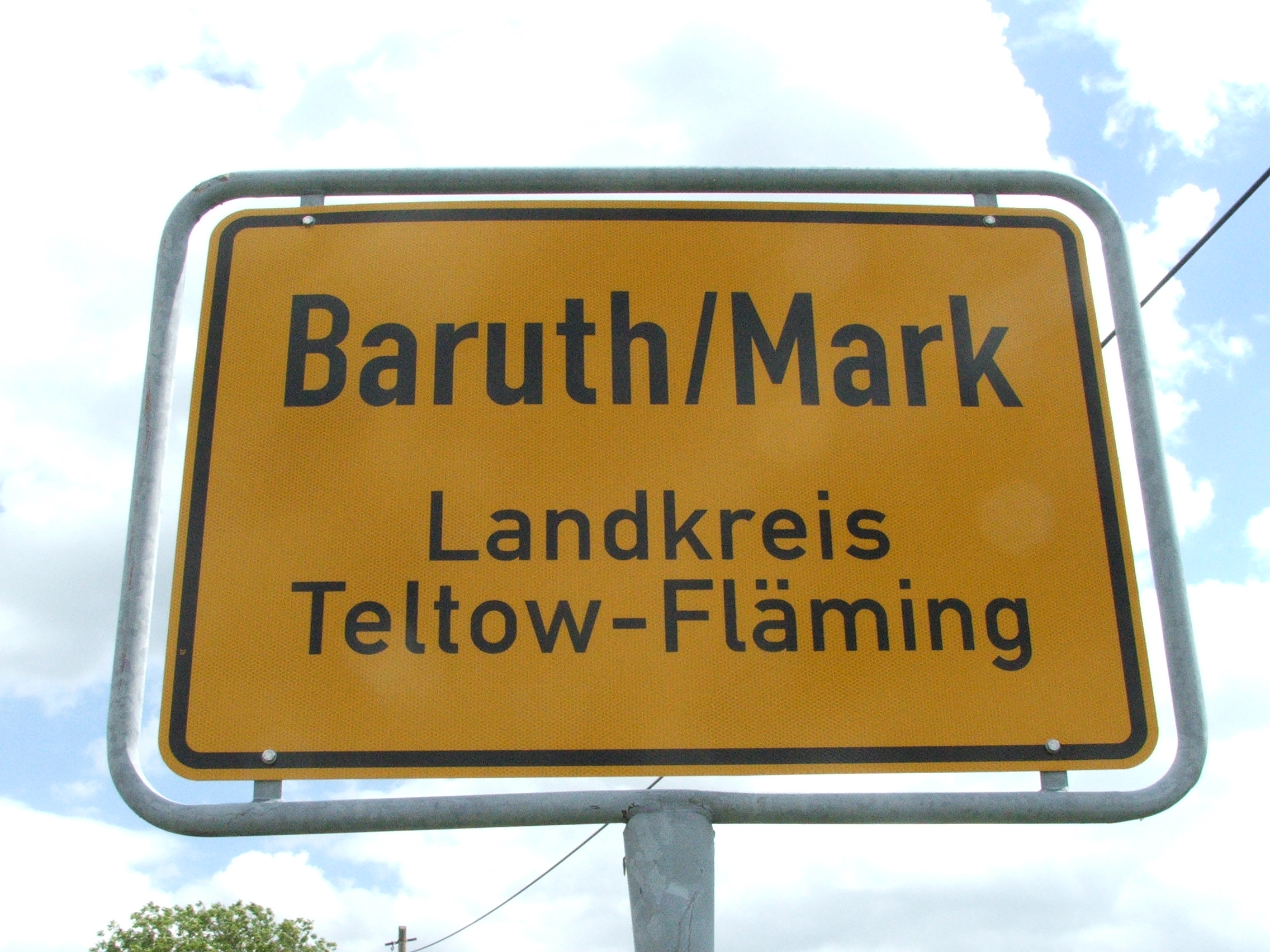
Street sign on entry to Baruth/Mark

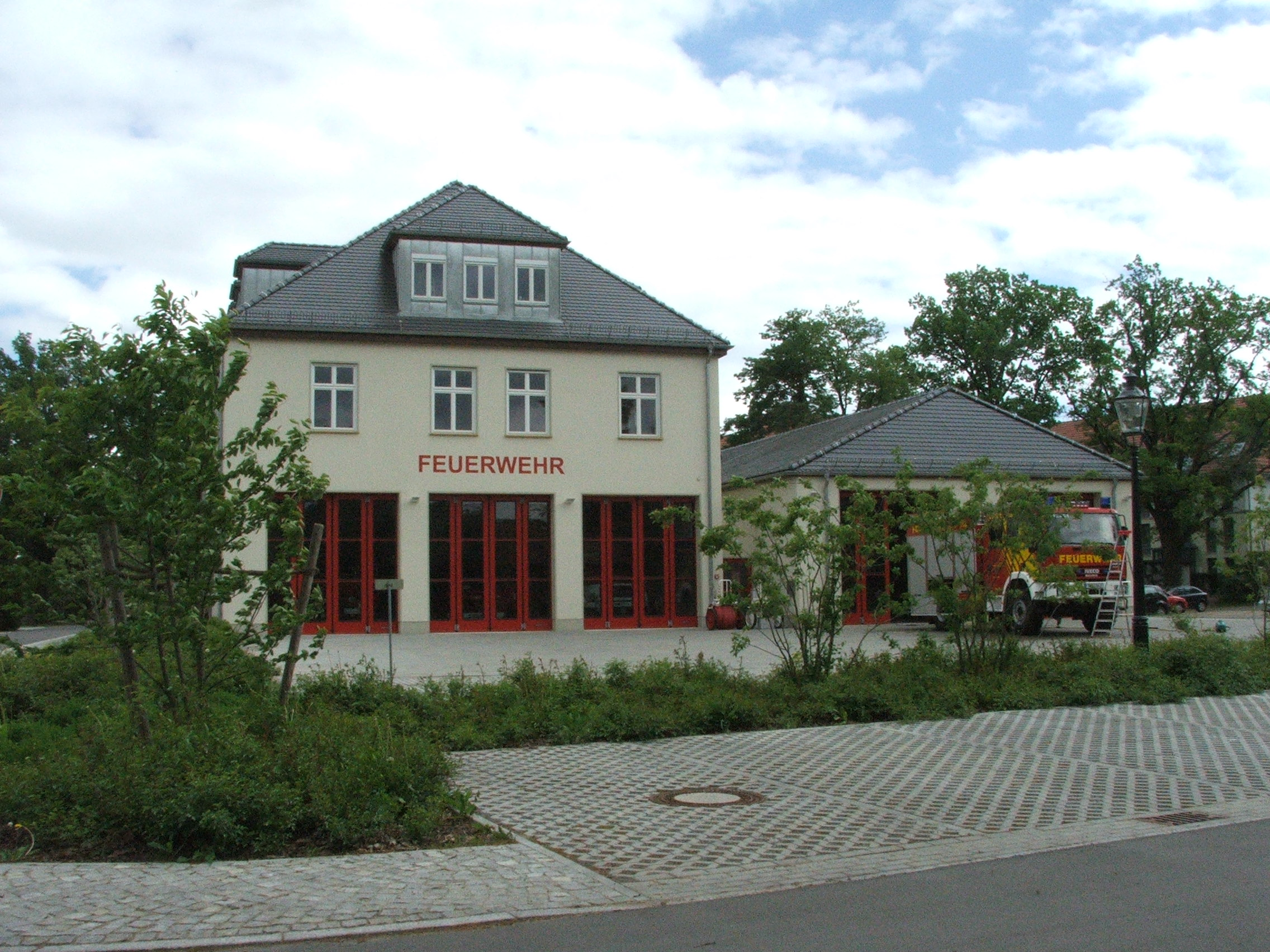
Firehouse

Castle Baruth

Fascia detail, Castle Baruth

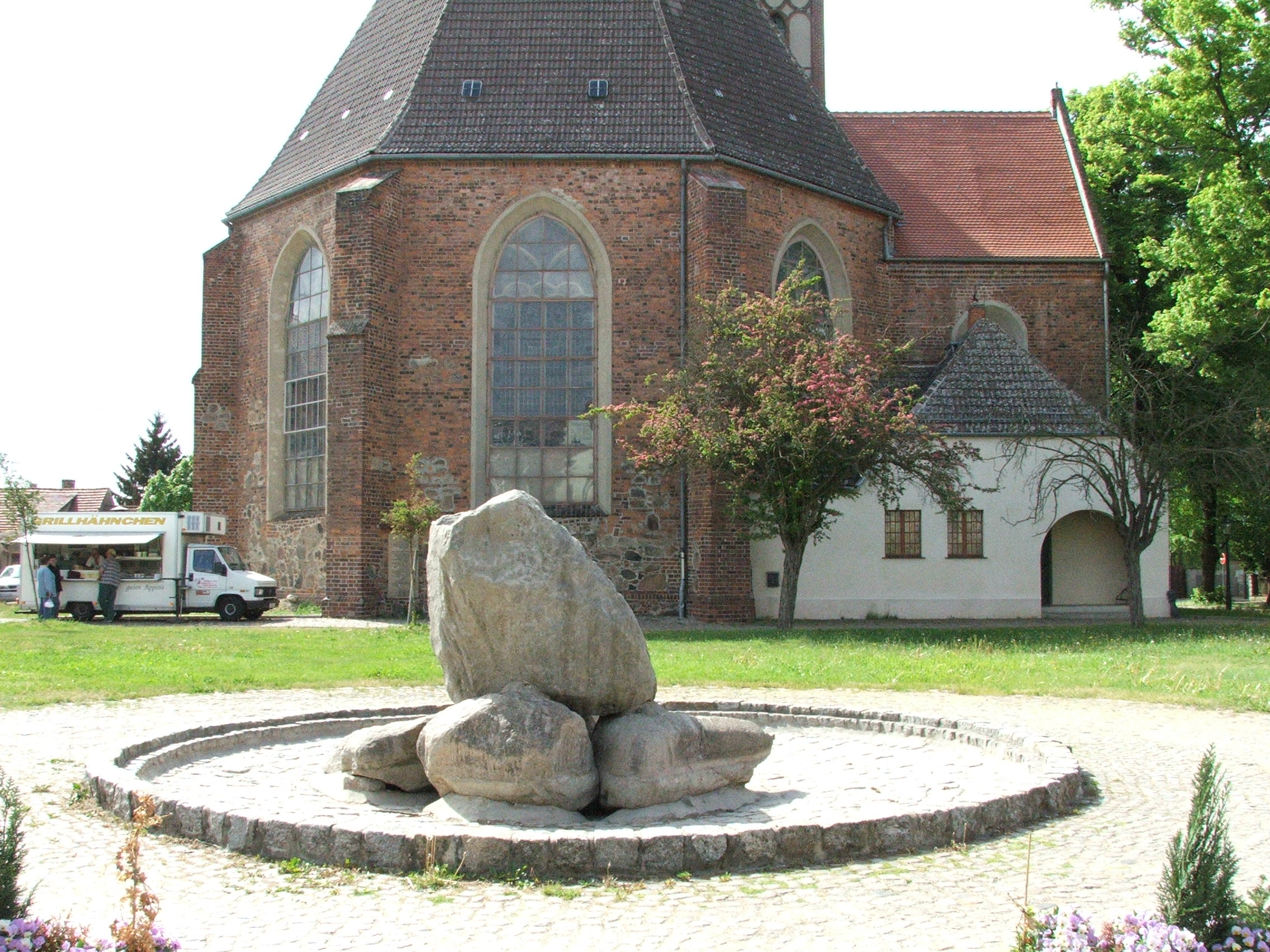
Cathedral

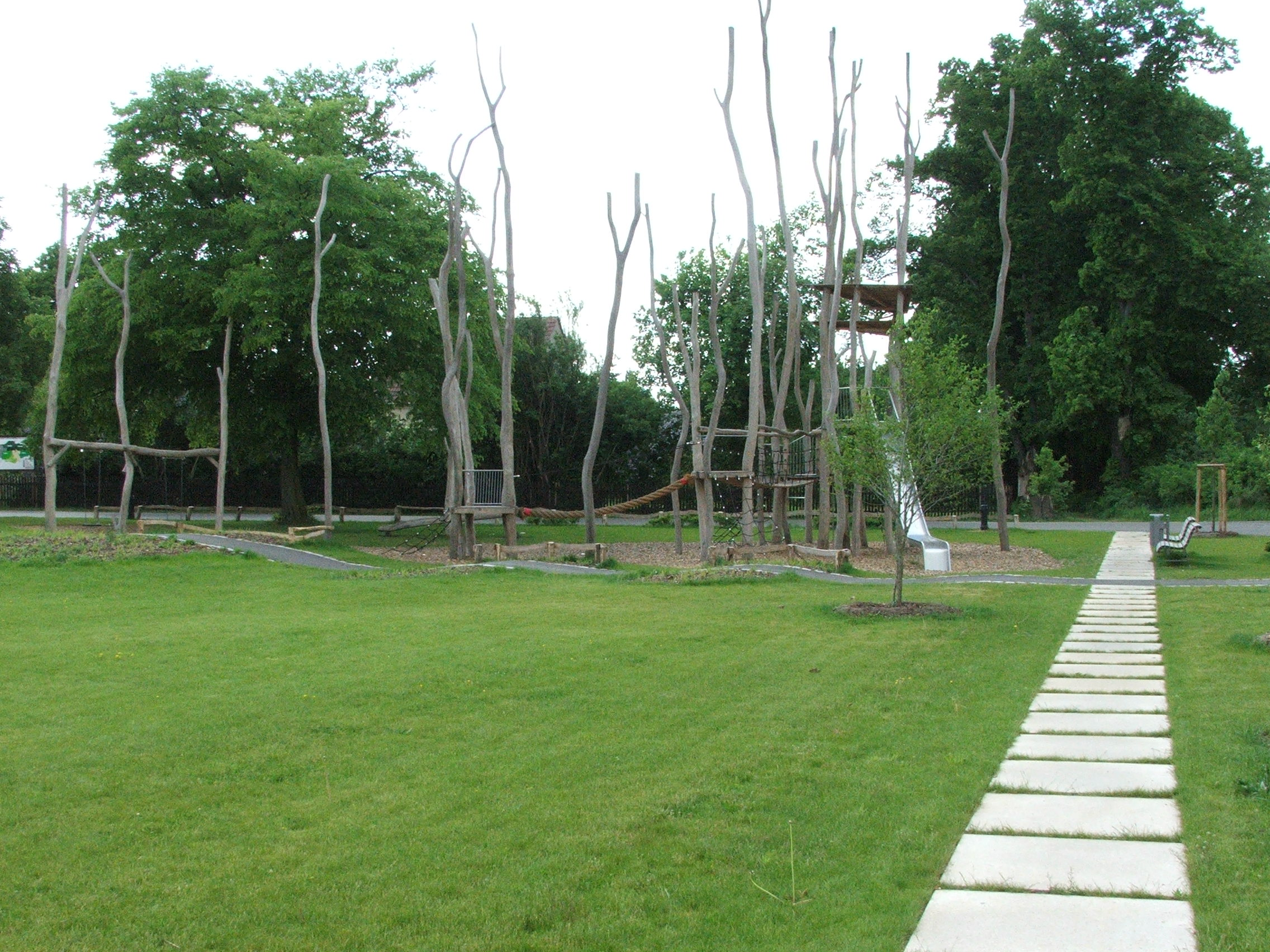
Municipal Playground

== Sons and daughters of the town ==
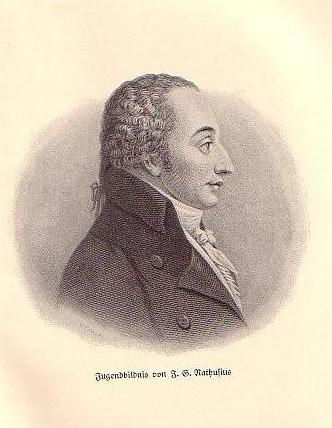
Johann Gottlob Nathusius

- Christian Kunth (1757-1829), educator, educator of Alexander and Wilhelm von Humboldt
- Johann Gottlob Nathusius (1760-1835), entrepreneur
- Johann Georg Lehmann (1765-1811), surveyor and cartographer
- Friedrich zu Solms-Baruth (1795-1879), politician, member of Prussian parliament
- Ewald von Lochow (1855-1942), Prussian general
- Feodora Schenk (1920-2006), German athlete
