= Carl Sigismund Kunth =

German botanist (1788–1850)

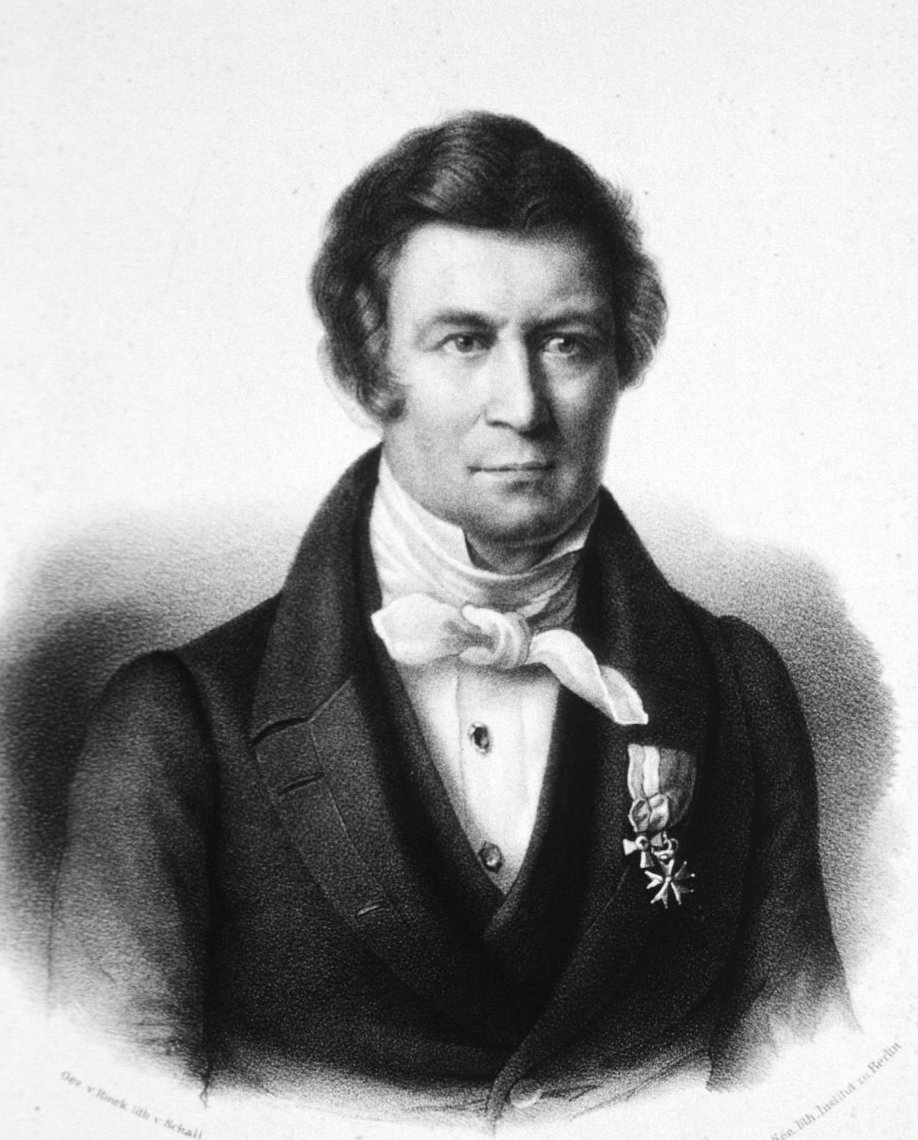
- Born: June 18, 1788; Leipzig, Electorate of Saxony, Holy Roman Empire
- Died: March 22, 1850 (aged 61)
- Other names: Karl Sigismund Kunth, Charles Sigismund Kunth
- Education: University of Berlin
- Occupation: Botanist
- Scientific career
- Patrons: Alexander von Humboldt
- Author abbrev. (botany): Kunth

Carl Sigismund Kunth (18 June 1788 – 22 March 1850) was a German botanist. He was also known as Karl Sigismund Kunth or anglicized as Charles Sigismund Kunth. He was one of the early systematic botanists who focused on studying the plants of the Americas.

Kunth's notable contributions include the publication of Nova genera et species plantarum quas in peregrinatione ad plagam aequinoctialem orbis novi collegerunt Bonpland et Humboldt. This work spanned seven volumes and was published between 1815 and 1825.

== Early life ==
Kunth was born in Leipzig, Saxony, in modern-day Germany. His uncle, Gottlob Johann Christian Kunth, was a politician and educator who tutored both the explorer Alexander von Humboldt and his older brother, the diplomat Wilhelm von Humboldt, as children.

Growing up, Kunth's father didn't have enough money for him to continue studying at the Leipzig Rathsschule. His uncle paid for him to move to Berlin, then a part of Prussia, and take a position at the Seehandlungsgesellschaft when he was 18. While working there, Kunth used the opportunity of being in Berlin to fill in gaps in his education and explore various parts of the sciences.

His interest in botany was cultivated by his association with the botanist Carl Ludwig Willdenow, who took him under his wing. Connections through his uncle and Willdenow led Kunth to meet Alexander von Humboldt, who facilitated his attendance at lectures held at the newly established University of Berlin.

== Career ==
=== Work with Alexander von Humboldt ===
Kunth moved into a Paris apartment with Humboldt in 1813. (Note: Some sources cite the year as 1810.) He served as Humboldt's assistant in Paris throughout the next decade, during which time he meticulously examined and described the plants collected by Humboldt and Aimé Bonpland during their expedition through the Americas, as published in the seven volumes of Personal Narrative of Travels to the Equinoctal Regions of the New Continent during the years 1799-1804. Originally Bonpland was going to write up the botanical notes and plant descriptions — however, Humboldt felt he was taking too long to do so, partly because of his work as head gardener for Napoleon's wife Josephine de Beauharnais. It once took Bonpland eight months to describe ten plants; Humboldt wrote back, saying "any botanist in Europe could do this in a fortnight." He had Kunth take over the work soon after.

During Humboldt's attempts to arrange an expedition to the Himalayas, he sent Kunth to Switzerland to study the plants growing in the Alps. He wanted him to have a solid foundational understanding of mountain ecosystems, so that when he accompanied Humboldt to India he could describe them accurately, as well as be able to draw comparisons between the two regions. Humboldt ultimately never received permission from the East India Company to make the Himalayas trip; however, Kunth's study of the Alps helped expand his frame of reference for his later work.

=== Later career ===
Upon his return to Berlin, Kunth became a professor of botany at the University of Berlin as well as vice president of the Berlin botanical garden. In recognition of his contributions, he was elected as a member of the Academy of Sciences in Berlin in 1829.

In 1829, Kunth embarked on a three-year journey to South America, traversing Chile, Peru, Brazil, Venezuela, Central America, and the West Indies.

Between 1833 and 1850, Kunth published five volumes of Enumeratio plantarum omnium hucusque cognitarum, secundum familias naturales disposita, adjectis characteribus, differentiis, et synonymis. These were detailed descriptions of plant species that he observed on his various travels and while working at the botanical gardens in Berlin, as well as specimens he studied that were sent to him from friends in the field. In it, he named a large number of genera and species, many still bearing the names he gave them today.

== Death and legacy ==
When he was around 50 years old, Kunth began experiencing "rheumatic pains." His hearing weakened and his health continued to diminish over the next few years. In 1845, he planned to travel to Salzburg to recuperate but fell ill in Munich and had to cancel the trip. Kunth spent the last few years of his life suffering from depression; in 1850, when he was 61 years old, he died by suicide.

Humboldt wrote an obituary for Kunth, (Note: This obituary serves as the main source of information for Kunth's career details.) in which he said: "But who could his early death shake more deeply in the innermost part of his feelings than me, who owes to his friend, in his 37 years of commonality of ideas and aspirations, a large part of the favor and attention that the public has given so abundantly and persistently to my and Bonpland's botanical research in the equinoctial zone."

Following his death in 1850, the Prussian government acquired Kunth's botanical collection, which subsequently became part of the esteemed Royal Herbarium in Berlin.

Kunth described and named numerous species and genera. He named certain genera in honor of his colleagues and collaborators, including Gaudichaudia. Contemporaries reciprocated by naming species after him. Bonpland initially honored him with the genus Kunthia, which is now considered synonymous with Chamaedorea. Additionally, Gaudichaud named a Hawaiian fern species, Doodia kunthiana (family Blechnaceae), after him. Another floral tribute is the Nilgiri flower Strobilanthes kunthiana.

- Note: Kunth = C.S. Kunth; H.B.K. = Humboldt, Bonpland & Kunth

== Selected publications ==
- Bonpland, Aimé; Humboldt, Alexander von; Kunth, Karl Sigismund (1815–1825). Nova genera et species plantarum :quas in peregrinatione ad plagam aequinoctialem orbis novi collegerunt /descripserunt, partim adumbraverunt Amat. Bonpland et Alex. de Humboldt; ex schedis autographis Amati Bonplandi in ordinem digessit Carol. Sigismund. Kunth ... 7 vols. Antwerp: Christophori Plantini., (also on Botanicus)
- Les mimosees et autres plantes legumineuses du nouveau continent (1819)
- Synopsis plantarum quas in itinere ad plagain aequinoctialem orbis novi collegerunt Humboldt et Bonpland (1822–3)
- Les graminees de l'Amerique du Sud (2 vols., 1825–1833)
- Handbuch der Botanik (Berlin, 1831)
- Enumeratio Plantarum Omnium Hucusque Cognitarum, Secundum Familias Naturales Disposita, Adjects Characteribus, Differentiis et Synonymis. Stutgardiae et Tubingae: Sumtibus J. G. Cottae. 1843.
- Lehrbuch der Botanik (1847)
- Les melastomees et autres plantes legumineuses de l'Amerique du Sud (1847–1852)

== See also ==
- Category:Taxa named by Carl Sigismund Kunth

== Sources ==
- Wilson, J. G.; Fiske, J., eds. (1892). "Kunth, Charles Sigismund" . Appletons' Cyclopædia of American Biography. New York: D. Appleton.
- Ernst Wunschmann (1883). "Kunth, Karl Sigismund" . Allgemeine Deutsche Biographie (in German). Vol. 17. Leipzig: Duncker & Humblot. pp. 394–397.
- Malpighiaceae/Kunth
