= Karl Friedrich von Dacheröden =

German lawyer

Karl Friedrich von Dacheröden or Dachröden (22 April 1732, Halberstadt, Saxony-Anhalt - 20 November 1809, Erfurt, Thuringia) was a German lawyer. His daughter Caroline married the diplomat Wilhelm von Humboldt.

== Life ==
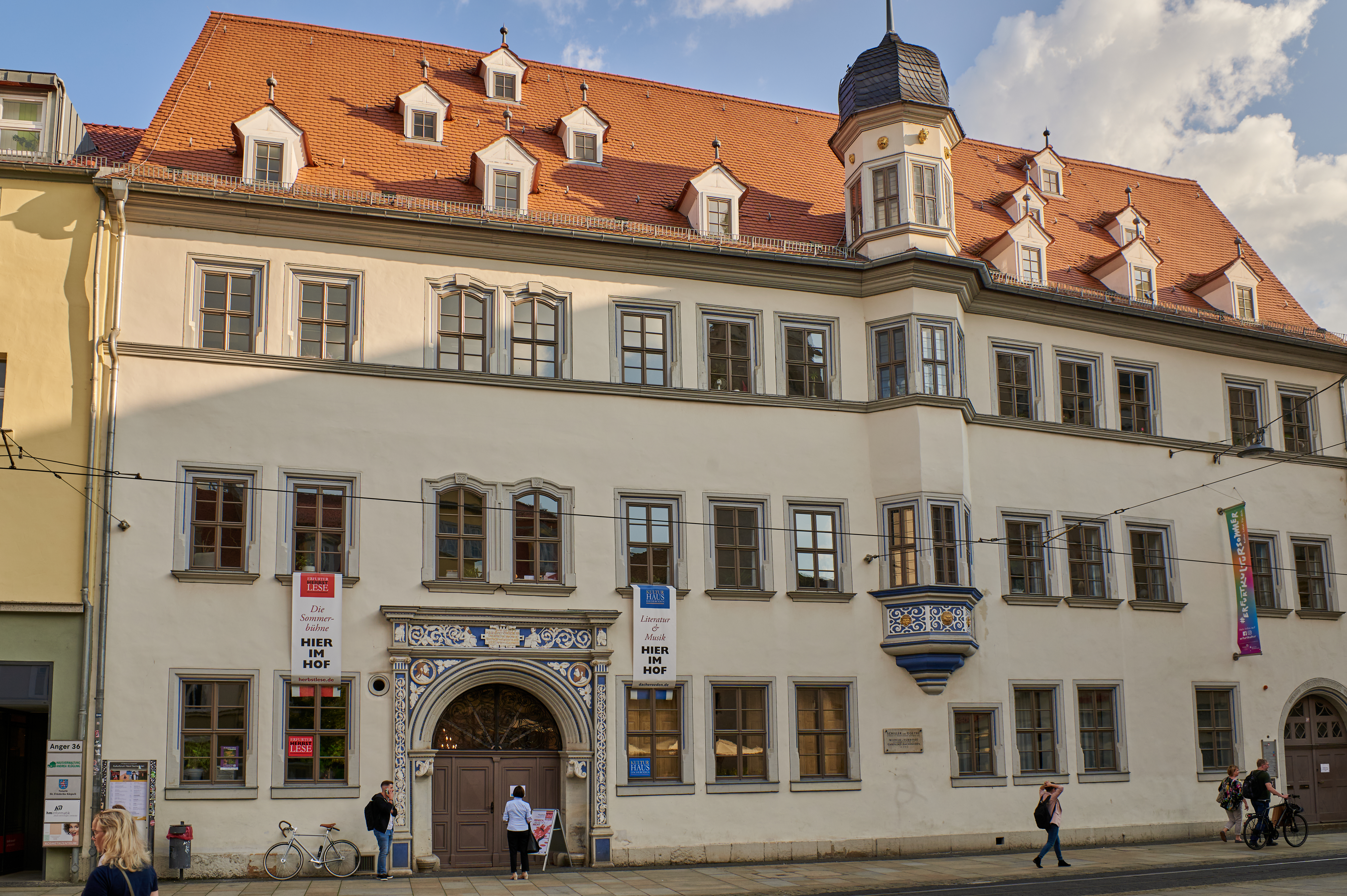
Haus Dacheröden in Erfurt (2020)

His parents were Charlotte Ludmilla von Posadowsky and her husband Karl Friedrich von Dacheröden the elder (1705–1742), a 'Regierungspräsident' or governor of Magdeburg and a 'Verwaltungsbeamter'. Like his father, Karl Friedrich the younger became a Prussian administrative officer.

== Bibliography ==
- (in German) Ilse Foerst-Crato: Karl Friedrich von Dacheröden. Mitteilungen des Mindener Geschichtsvereins, Jahrgang 49 (1977), S. 131–136.
