= Paplitz =

Paplitz may refer to:

- Paplitz (Baruth/Mark), a village in Brandenburg, Germany
- Paplitz (Genthin), a village in Saxony-Anhalt, Germany
