= Wilhelm von Humboldt Memorial, Berlin =

Wilhelm von Humboldt Memorial
- Wilhelm-von-Humboldt-Denkmal (German)
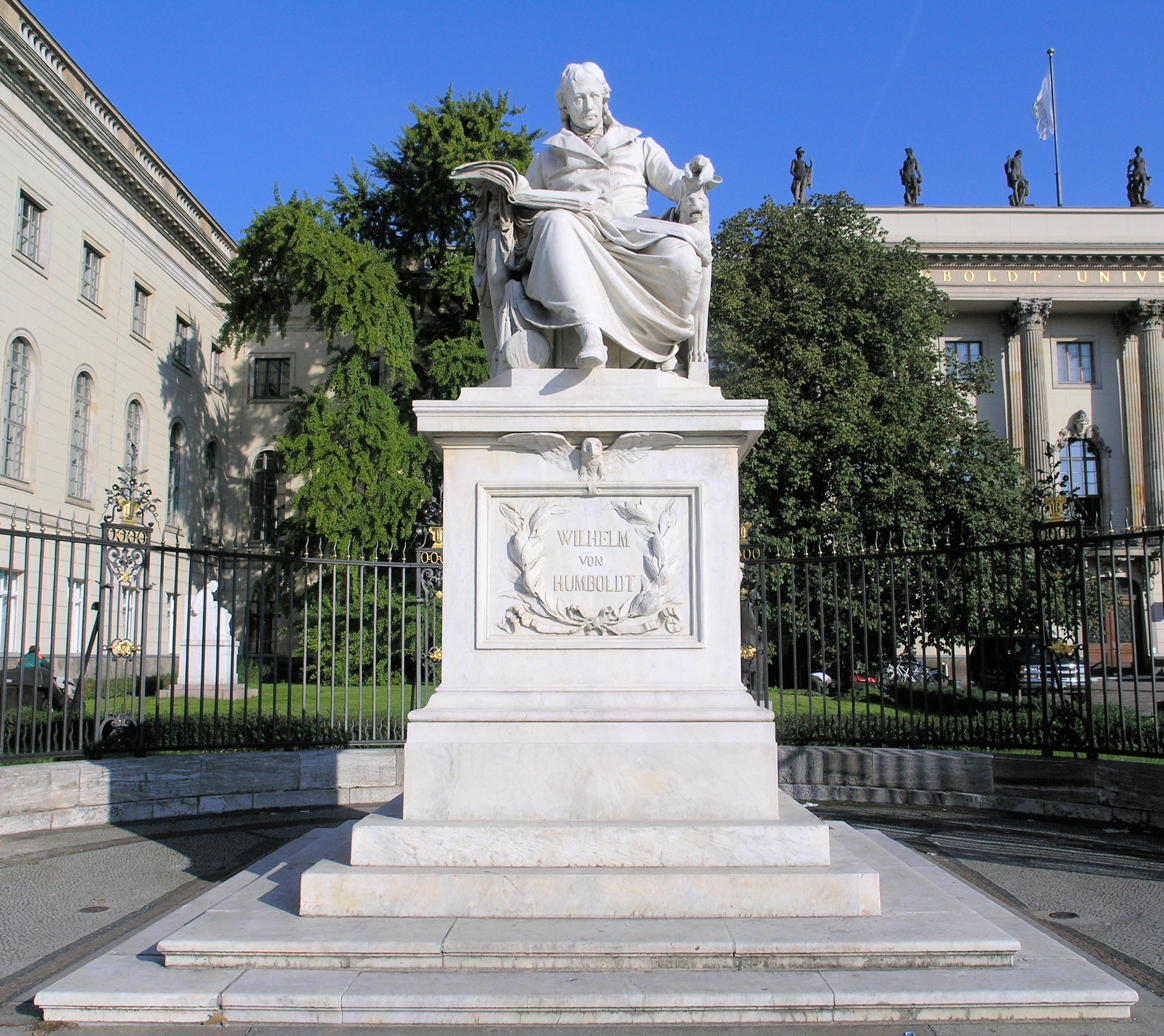
- Artist: Paul Otto
- Year: 1882
- Medium: Marble
- Dimensions: 5.70 m (18.7 ft)
- Location: Unter den Linden, Berlin, Germany

The Wilhelm von Humboldt Memorial to the left of the Humboldt University main building on Unter den Linden avenue in Berlin's Mitte district commemorates the Prussian polymath and education reformer Wilhelm von Humboldt (1767–1835). Created in 1882 by Paul Otto in neo-baroque style, the marble statue is a masterpiece of the Berlin school of sculpture.

== Gallery ==
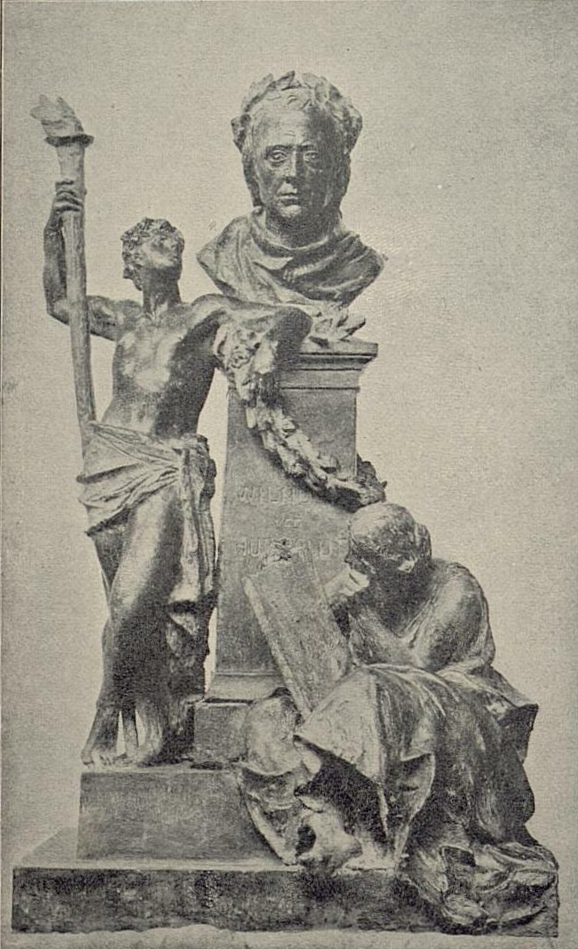
Early model by Reinhold Begas

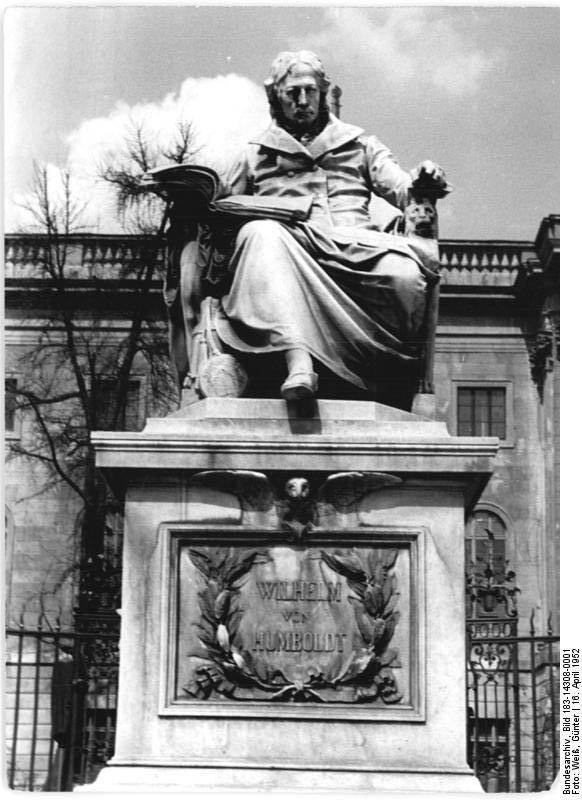
Marble statue in 1952

Humboldt University main building
