= The Limits of State Action =

Philosophical treatise by Wilhelm von Humboldt

The Limits Of State Action (original German title Ideen zu einem Versuch die Grenzen der Wirksamkeit des Staats zu bestimmen) is a philosophical treatise by Wilhelm von Humboldt, which is a major work of the German Enlightenment. Though written in the early 1790s, it was not published in its entirety until 1852, long after von Humboldt's death in 1835. It was a significant source for the ideas that John Stuart Mill popularized in his 1859 book On Liberty: a brief quotation provides the epigraph that Mill chose for that work, and it is discussed favorably by Mill in its third chapter, "Of Individuality, as One of the Elements of Well-Being." Mill had access to an 1854 English translation under the title The Sphere and Duties of Government.

Humboldt defines the criteria by which the permissible limits of the state's activities may be determined. His basic principle, like that of Mill, is that the only justification for government intervention is the prevention of harm to others. He discusses in detail the role and limits of the state's responsibility for the welfare, security and morals of its citizens.

Wilhelm von Humboldt describes his purpose in writing The Limits of State Action as: "The grand, leading principle, towards which every argument … unfolded in these pages directly converges, is the absolute and essential importance of human development in its richest diversity." Many commentators believe that Humboldt’s discussion of issues of freedom and individual responsibility possesses greater clarity and directness than John Stuart Mill’s. “Germany’s greatest philosopher of freedom,” as F. A. Hayek called him, has an exuberance and attention to principle that make it a valuable introduction to classical liberal political thought. It is also crucial for an understanding of liberalism as it developed in Europe at the turn of the nineteenth century. Humboldt explores the role that liberty plays in individual development, discusses criteria for permitting the state to limit individual actions, and suggests ways of confining the state to its proper bounds. In so doing, he uniquely combines the ancient concern for human excellence and the modern concern for what has come to be known as negative liberty.
