= Heinrich von Bülow (diplomat) =

Prussian statesman and diplomat

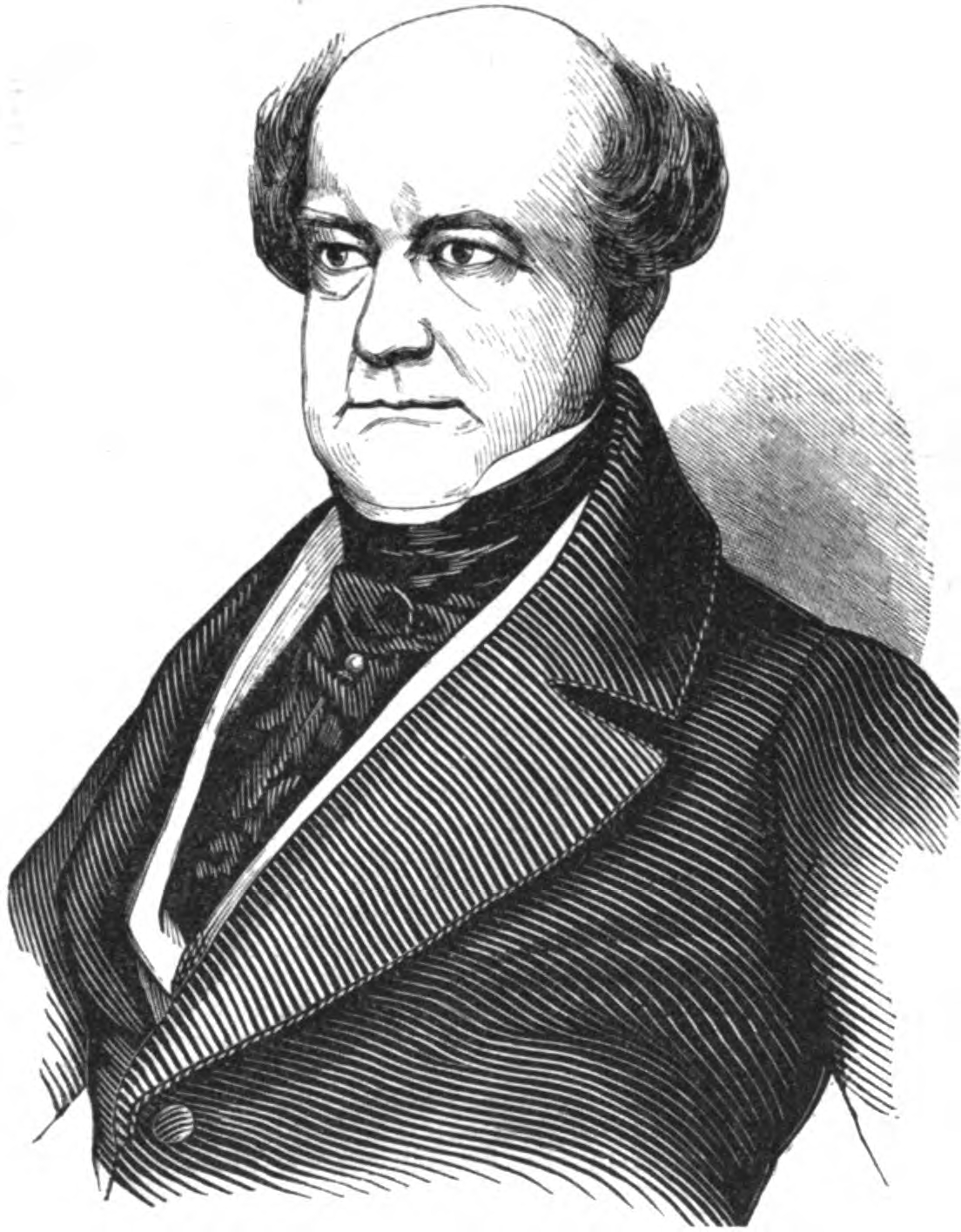

Foreign minister of Prussia
- In office 2 April 1842 – 29 September 1845
- Monarch: Frederick William IV
- Preceded by: Mortimer von Maltzan
- Succeeded by: Karl Ernst Wilhelm von Canitz und Dallwitz

Personal details
- Born: 16 September 1792 Schwerin, Duchy of Mecklenburg-Schwerin
- Died: 6 February 1846 (aged 53) Berlin, Kingdom of Prussia
- Spouse: Gabriele von Humboldt
- Children: 7

Heinrich Freiherr von Bülow (16 September 1792 – 6 February 1846) was a Prussian diplomat and Foreign Minister.

== Career ==
Bülow, born to members of the noble Bülow family, was educated at the Domschule Güstrow, then studied law from 1810 onwards, at first in Jena, then in Heidelberg and Geneva. In 1813 he joined the Walmodensche Korps as a lieutenant and was made adjutant to the Prussian colonel August Ludwig Ferdinand von Nostitz, on whose campaigns he distinguished himself several times.

After the war, he dedicated himself to diplomacy, working under the minister Wilhelm von Humboldt, when the latter led the negotiations on determining the borders of the German territories in Frankfurt am Main. He followed von Humboldt to London in 1817 as embassy secretary and in 1819 to Berlin, where he took over the section for trade and maritime affairs in the Prussian Foreign Office. Here he married Wilhelm von Humboldt's younger daughter Gabriele (1802–1887) in 1820.

He was particularly successful and active in preparing the Zollverein (German Customs Union) through the conclusion of customs agreements with the neighbouring states. Also as ambassador to London, to which he was appointed in 1827, he worked to advance the Zollverein. He won the trust of the British statesmen and played a successful part in the negotiations over Belgium and the Eastern Question (1840–41). In autumn 1841 he was made envoy to the Bundestag in Frankfurt am Main, and by April 1842 was appointed Foreign Minister of Prussia in place of Mortimer von Maltzan. He and the Minister of War Hermann von Boyen belonged to the more liberal tendency in the cabinet, but had only a negligible influence on politics in general. Bülow left the government in 1845 and retired to Tegel.

== See also ==
- Bülow (disambiguation)
