= Karl Ernst Wilhelm von Canitz und Dallwitz =

Prussian general and statesman (1787–1850)

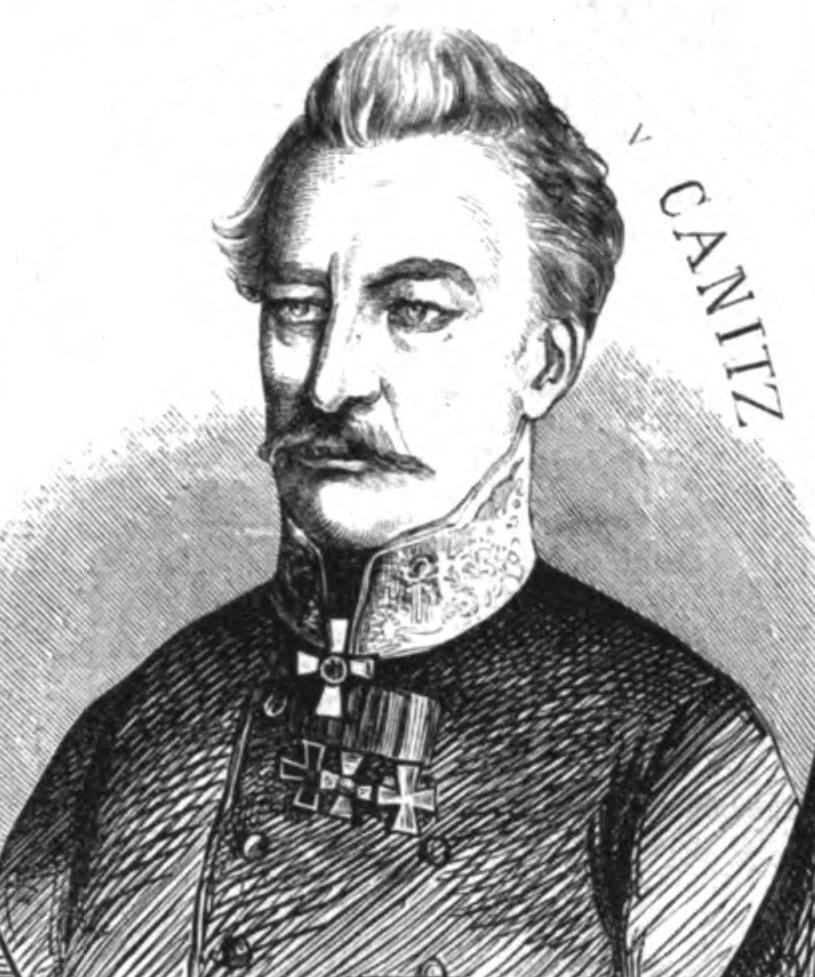

Foreign minister of Prussia
- In office 29 September 1845 – 17 March 1848
- Monarch: Frederick William IV
- Preceded by: Heinrich von Bülow
- Succeeded by: Adolf Heinrich von Arnim-Boitzenburg

Personal details
- Born: 17 November 1787 Kassel, Landgraviate of Hesse-Cassel
- Died: 25 April 1850 (aged 62) Frankfurt (Oder), Kingdom of Prussia
- Spouse: Auguste von Schmerfeld
- Children: 6

Karl Ernst Wilhelm Freiherr von Canitz und Dallwitz (17 November 1787 in Kassel – 25 April 1850 in Frankfurt (Oder) was a Prussian general and statesman.

== Life ==
Canitz und Dallwitz came from an aristocratic family with roots in the present-day municipality of Thallwitz, in the Meissen-Saxonian area of the Mulde. At the University of Marburg he studied jurisprudence and then entered the service of Hesse-Kassel. During the campaign of 1806 he joined the Prussian Army. In 1812 he was assigned to the general staff of General Ludwig Yorck von Wartenburg, as a part of the Prussian army departed for Russia. After the signing of the Convention of Tauroggen he entered Russian service. Here he participated in the campaign on Berlin and Hamburg under Friedrich Karl von Tettenborn. During the cease-fire in 1813 he returned to Prussian service and again served in the general staff under Yorck. After the war he belonged to the Generalkommando (Command HQ) in Breslau.

In 1821, Canitz und Dallwitz became adjutant to Prince Wilhelm, the brother of Frederick William III of Prussia, and simultaneously was a teacher at the Allgemeine Kriegsschule (General War College), which later became the Prussian Military Academy, in Berlin. In this period he anonymously wrote the book: Betrachtungen über die Thaten und Schicksale der Reiterei in den Feldzügen Friedrichs II. und der neuern Zeit; English: Observations on the Actions and Fates of the Cavalry in the Campaigns of Frederick II and Modern Times (2 Bde. Berlin 1823–24). When Prussia took on a mediating role in the Seventh Russo-Turkish war in 1828, Canitz und Dallwitz was sent as envoy extraordinary to Constantinople.

In 1830 he was made chief of the general staff in the Guards Corps, and soon thereafter commander of the 1st Hussar Regiment (1. Leib-Husaren-Regiment Nr. 1). At the Polish rebellion against Russia, he was in the headquarters of the Russian Field Marshal Hans Karl von Diebitsch. In 1833 he was an envoy to the court of Hesse-Kassel and was made a Major General. From 1837 he was an envoy in Hannover and Braunschweig, and from 1842 to 1845 in Vienna.

After Heinrich von Bülow's resignation (1845), Canitz und Dallwitz was appointed Foreign Minister of Prussia. He aligned his foreign policy with that of the Austrians and Russians, and also influenced domestic policy in terms of his strongly parochial outlook. On 17 March 1848 he resigned, along with the rest of the Bodelschwingh government. In May 1849 he was sent to Vienna, to secure Austria's agreement to the creation of a closer federation, as planned by Prussia. However, Canitz und Dallwitz was forced to return empty-handed. He then took over the command of the 5th Division, in Frankfurt (Oder).

Karl Ernst Wilhelm Freiherr von Canitz und Dallwitz died on 25 April 1850 in Frankfurt (Oder).
