= Gottlob Johann Christian Kunth =

German politician and educator (1757–1829)

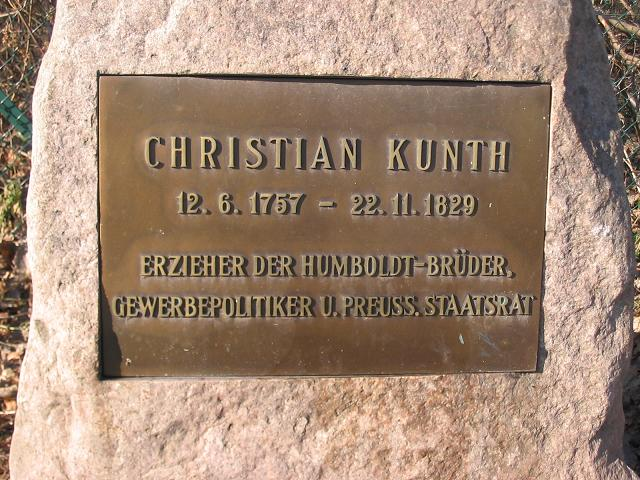
Memorial plaque for Gottlob Johann Christian Kunth at the entrance to Tegel Castle.

Gottlob Johann Christian Kunth (12 June 1757 in Baruth – 22 November 1829 in Berlin) was a German politician and educator. Today he is known above all as the tutor and fatherly friend of the brothers Wilhelm and Alexander von Humboldt.

== Life ==
Kunth was the son of Johann Siegmund Kunth, a senior Protestant minister and hymn writer who died in Baruth in 1779. In 1772, he started attending the upper level of gymnasium in Halle. He then began studying law in Leipzig. In 1776, however, his financial situation forced him to abandon his studies. He went to work as a private tutor at Tegel Castle, residence of the Humboldt family, in 1777. Marie-Elisabeth von Humboldt (née Colomb) engaged him to tutor her sons Wilhelm and Alexander. Kunth, committed to the ideals of the Enlightenment, instructed the Humboldts in mathematics, German, Latin, Greek, French, and history. He had a lasting influence on their development and planned the future educational paths of both brothers. Kunth arranged private lectures by Marcus Herz, for example, and participation in the literary salons of Henriette Herz at the famous couple's house.

Kunth was a close confidant of Alexander Georg von Humboldt, the head of the family. After Humboldt's early death in 1779, Kunth assumed the responsibility of advising his widow, Marie-Elisabeth, and managing her estate. After her death, Kunth served as executor of her will and trustee for her two sons. In addition, he designed the grounds of Tegel Castle.

Wilhelm von Humboldt later advocated for Kunth's appointment to a position with the Prussian statesman and reformer Baron vom Stein. In 1796, Kunth became trade commissioner of the Prussian State Council. In this position, he became one of the politicians most involved in economic affairs. In 1810, he established the Technical Deputation for Trade and Industry in Berlin and became its director. That same year, he joined the Gesetzlose Gesellschaft zu Berlin, an organization dedicated to the reform of Prussian government and society.

Kunth was buried, according to his wishes, near the tomb of the Humboldt family on the grounds of Tegel Castle. A plaque commemorating Kunth was placed at the entrance to Tegel Castle in 1993. Since January 2006, Kundtanger, a street in the Falkenberg locality of Berlin's Lichtenberg borough, has been named for him. The street is located in the development Wohnen am Gehrensee, where several streets bear the names of friends and associates of the Humboldt family.

== Family ==
- Parents: Johann Sigismund Kunth (1700–1779) and Friederike Juliane Hausherr (1723–1804)
- Married in 1806: Margaretha Marawiakowska (in some sources: Malgorzata Mankwiatowska) (1783?–1863)
- Children: Adelheid Sigismunde Elisabeth Kunth (1808–1834), Bertha Kunth (1810–1879), Heinrich Kunth (1811–1850), Adalbert Sigismund Ernst Kunth (1814–1858)
- Nephew: Karl Sigismund Kunth (1788–1850), a botanist who devoted much of his career to evaluating the samples gathered by Alexander von Humboldt and Aimé Bonpland during their expedition to Latin America.
