= Marie-Elisabeth von Humboldt =

Mother of Wilhelm and Alexander von Humboldt (1741–1796)

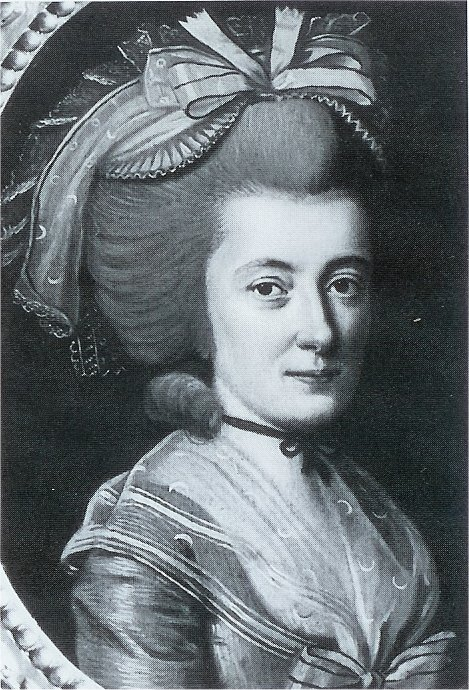
- Born: Marie-Elisabeth Colomb; December 8, 1741; Berlin, Prussia, Holy Roman Empire
- Died: November 19, 1796 (aged 54); Tegel Castle
- Spouse(s): Friedrich Ernst von Holwede; Alexander Georg von Humboldt
- Children: Wilhelm and Alexander

Marie-Elisabeth von Humboldt (December 8, 1741 – November 19, 1796) was the mother of Wilhelm and Alexander von Humboldt, born from the union with Alexander Georg von Humboldt, her second husband.

== Family ==
Von Humboldt came from a family of merchants and artisans, some of whom were of huguenots origin. Her grandfather, the parisian merchant Henri Colomb (d. 1719), first emigrated to Copenhagen after the lifting of the Edict of Nantes (1685), where he became a trimmer at the royal court. Around 1711, he settled in Neustadt an der Dosse in Brandenburg-Prussia and sat on the board of directors of the royal mirror factory. This move was caused by his father-in-law, the goldsmith Jean-Henri de Moor (d. 1722) from Wageningen in the province of Gelderland, himself director of the factory from 1696 to 1711. Jean-Henri de Moor was the founder from the French colony of Neustadt. His son Jean Henri de Moor (Johann Heinrich de Moor) continued to run the company with Henri Colomb as partner.

Marie-Elisabeth's father, Johann Heinrich Colomb (1695–1759), was also director of the Neustadt mirror factory from 1733 to 1741. He then entered the Prussian civil service as director of the East Frisian Chamber. He moved to Berlin with his family as a landlord.

On her mother's side, Marie-Elisabeth came from the Durham de Grange family of Prussian civil servants of Scottish origin. They moved from Scotland to Prussia in 1650. Alexander and Wilhelm von Humboldt's great-grandfather was Wilhelm Durham (1658–1735), Royal Prussian tax general, secret high court of appeal and church council, as well as dean and head of the Berlin parish. He and his family lived in the house at Jüdenhof 9 in Berlin. Her daughter Justine Susanne (1716–1762) was the mother of Marie-Elisabeth.

== Weddings ==
In 1760, Marie-Elisabeth Colomb married Friedrich Ernst von Holwede (March 12, 1723 — January 26, 1765), baron, hereditary and lord of Tegel, Ringenwalde and Crummecavel. Two children were born from this marriage, a daughter who died at an early age, and a son, Heinrich Friedrich Ludwig Ferdinand von Holwede (1762–1817), who joined the Berlin cuirassier regiment, men-at-arms, like Rittmeister. Friedrich Ernst von Holwede was a canon of the St. Sebastian Monastery in Magdeburg. He died in 1765 and left his widow the hereditary lease of Tegel Castle near Berlin and the Ringenwalde estate with the Crummecavel farm in Neumark (district of Soldin, today Poland). In addition, she benefited from an inheritance from her parents, which included a library with around 300 book titles and especially the house at Jägerstraße 22 in Berlin. The Berlin House is today the headquarters of the Berlin-Brandenburg Academy of Sciences and Humanitiess.

On October 19, 1766, Marie-Elisabeth von Holwede was married for the second time: on the Lancke estate near Berlin, to the royal chamberlain and sergeant-colonel (major) of the cavalry a. D. Alexander Georg von Humboldt (1720–1779). He came from a family of Pomeranian civil servants and officers who had served various Brandenburg-Prussian princes.

== Education of her children ==
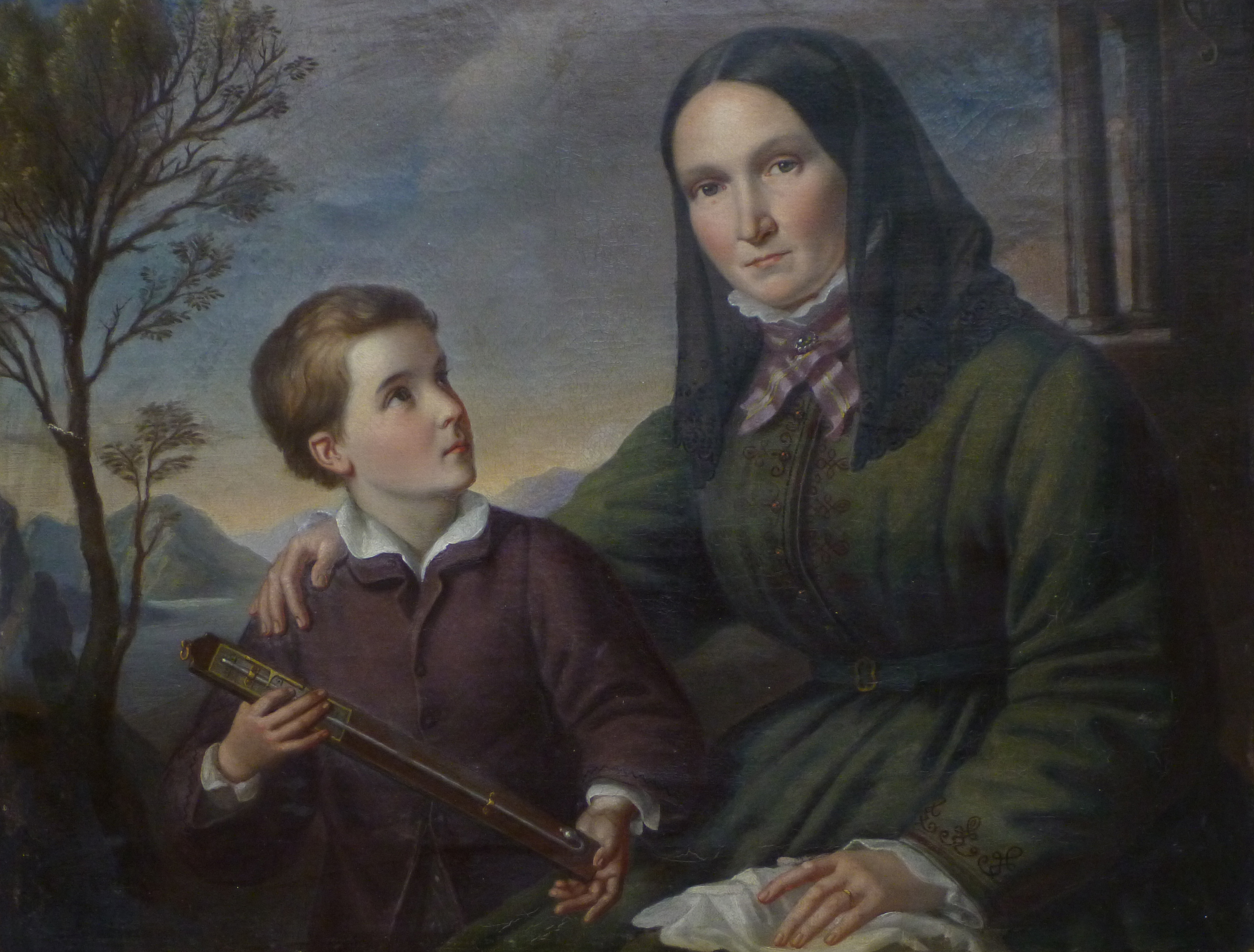
Marie-Elisabeth von Humboldt with her son, Alexander von Humboldt as a boy, holding a barometer, c. 1780

The Humboldt brothers' mother is described as reserved and very serious by biographers. Marie-Elisabeth impresses with her intelligence and her character, according to the testimonies of Caroline von Briest and Caroline von Dacheroeden.

One of Marie-Elisabeth von Humboldt's greatest achievements was the consistent planning and implementation of her sons' education from a spiritual and moral perspective. At that time, homeschooling was a common practice by family members and having tutors was an option for the wealthy and nobles. She hired a very large number of teachers to do this. They included Administrator Gottlob Johann Christian Kunth (1757–1829), Johann Jakob Engel, Ernst Gottfried Fischer, David Friedländer, Daniel Chodowiecki.

== Benefactress of the parish of Falkenberg ==
In 1791, Marie-Elisabeth von Humboldt bought the Falkenberg estate (today part of the Berlin district of Lichtenberg) from Lieutenant Colonel von Lochau. In her will, she left a bequest to enable the maintenance of the church tower and the Humboldt cemetery in Falkenberg. This legacy was under the direct control of the royal government in Potsdam, then, from 1891, under the supervision of the Royal Consistory of the province of Brandenburg. The administration of the inheritance was then transferred from the parish priest to the parish church council of Falkenberg.

This foundation has benefited the parish of Falkenberg for around 130 years. In addition to the maintenance of the church tower, part of the interest on the endowment capital had to be spent for precisely defined charitable purposes: a bonus for the village teacher of Falkenberg and some small school bonuses for diligent students. This foundation ceased during the global economic crisis of 1929.

== Death ==
Elisabeth von Humboldt died on November 19, 1796 following a long battle with breast cancer. She was buried on the Falkenberg estate, in the family cemetery, alongside her husband and a daughter from her first marriage, who had died prematurely.

== See also ==
- History of women in Germany
- Women in Germany
