= Gottlieb Schick =

German painter

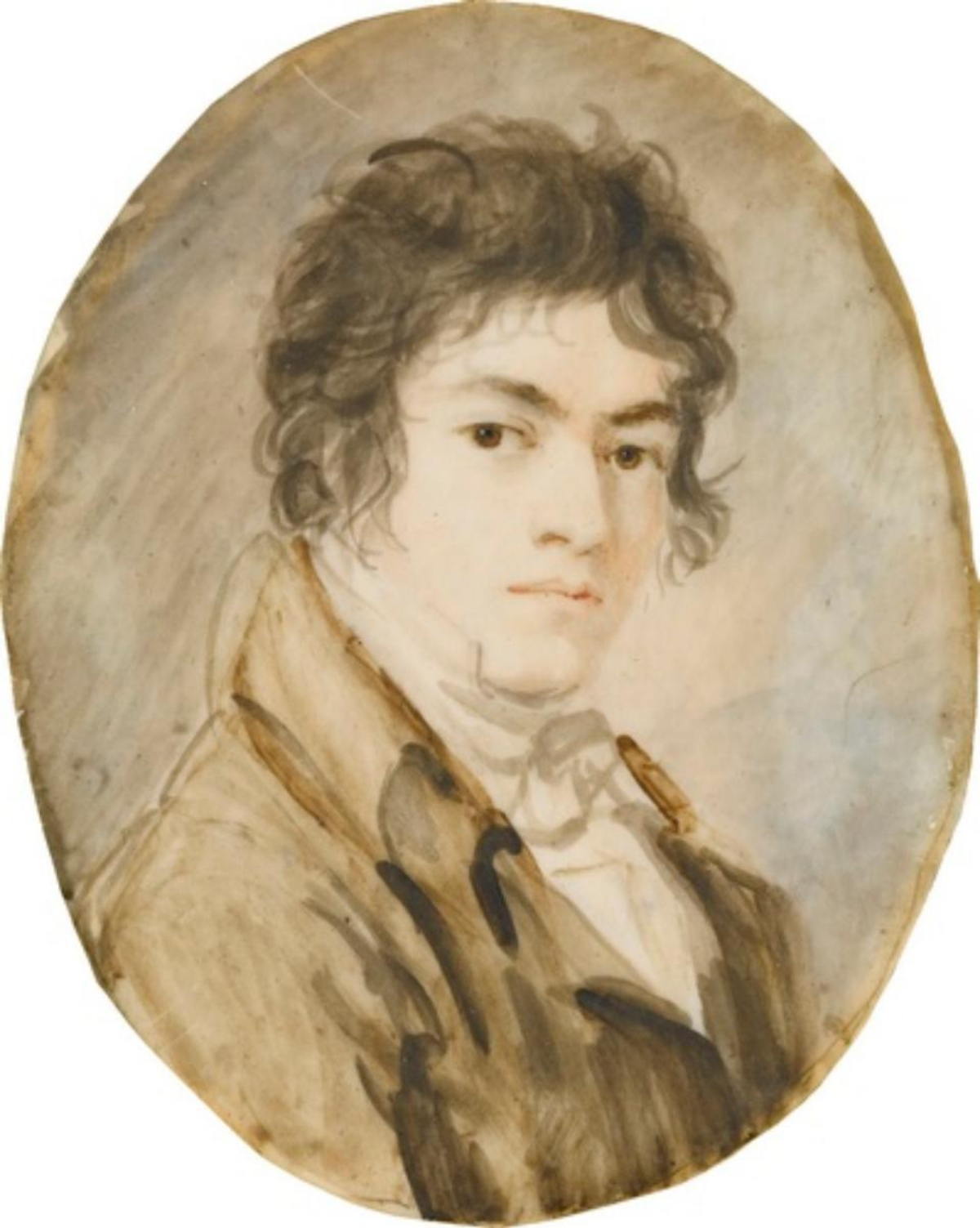
Self-portrait, c. 1800

Christian Gottlieb Schick (15 August 1776 – 7 May 1812) was a German Neoclassical painter. His history paintings, portraits, and landscapes are characterized by romantic tendencies. Of these, he is best known for his portraits.

== Life and work ==
He was born in Stuttgart. He studied from 1795 to 1797 at the Hohe Karlsschule under Philipp Friedrich von Hetsch, a follower of Jacques-Louis David. In 1797–98 he studied under Johann Heinrich von Dannecker, after which he relocated to Paris where he spent 1799 to 1802 in David's studios.

Between 1802 and 1811 he stayed in Rome, where he became an important figure in that city's artistic and intellectual circles. He was an especially good friend of Wilhelm von Humboldt and his family. In Schick's last years, his style of Raphaelesque classicism gradually acquired a romantic orientation. In 1809, he was presented with a special citation by a group of French and Italian artists.

He returned to Stuttgart in 1811, but died there only a few months later, of heart disease.

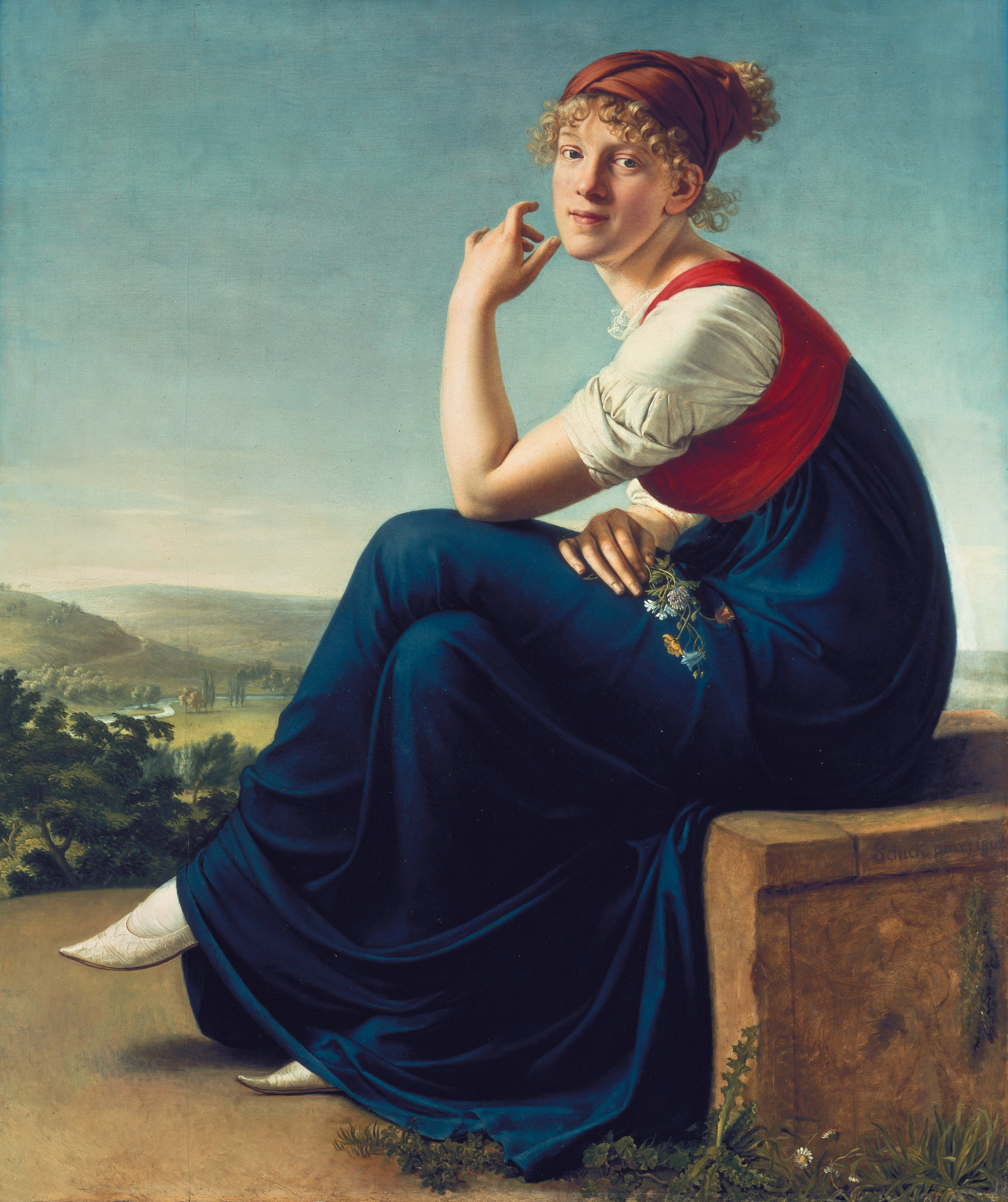
Heinrike Dannecker (1802)
