= Paplitz (Baruth/Mark) =

- Stadtteil of Baruth/Mark
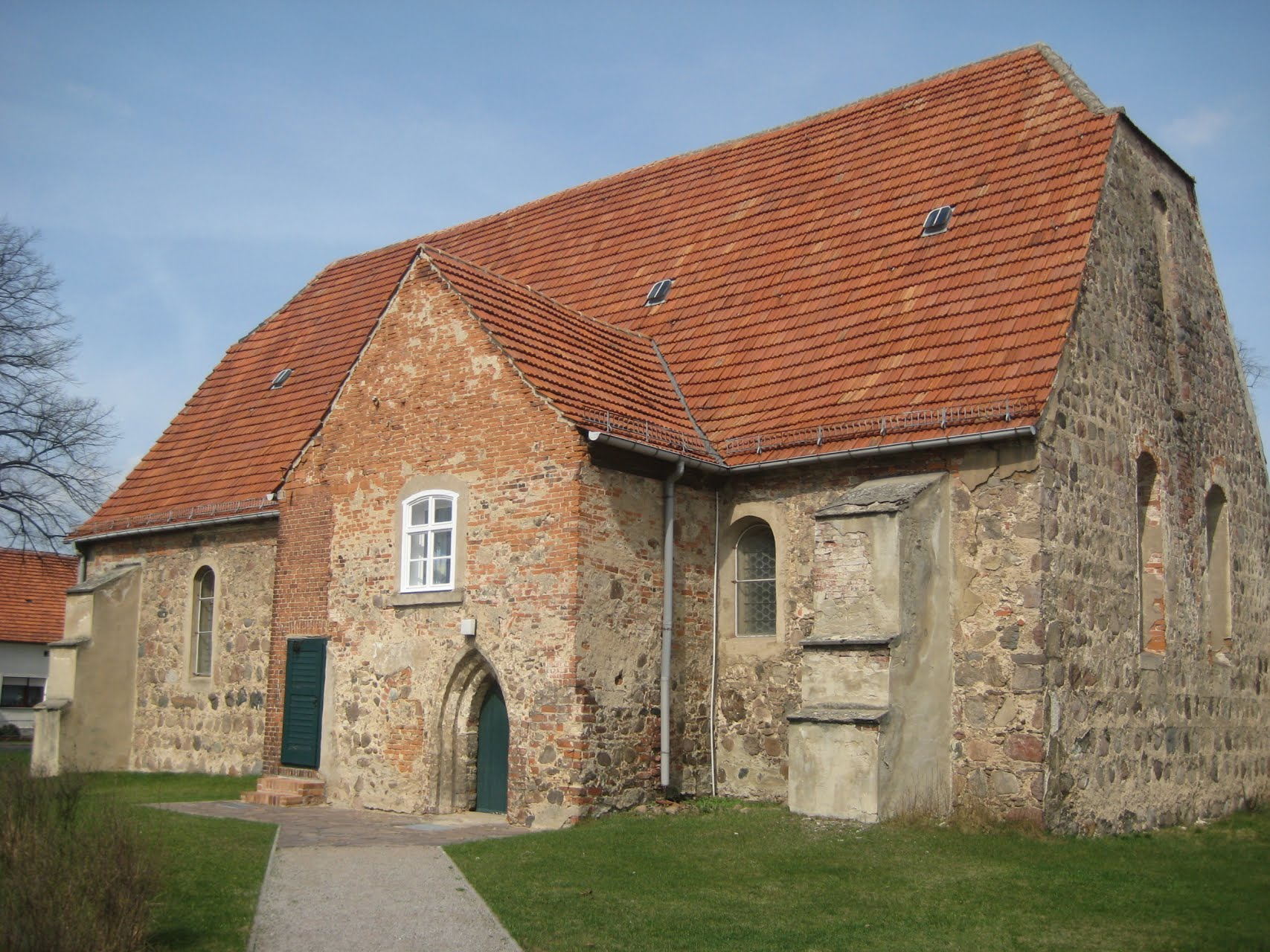
- Church in Paplitz
- Interactive map of Paplitz
- Location within Germany Location within Brandenburg
- Coordinates: 52°3′7″N 13°28′9″E
- Country: Germany
- State: Brandenburg
- District: Teltow-Fläming
- Town: Baruth/Mark

Area
  - Total: 18.24 km^{2} (7.04 sq mi)
- Elevation: 48 m (157 ft)

Population (2014)
  - Total: 358
  - Density: 19.6/km^{2} (50.8/sq mi)
- Time zone: UTC+01:00 (CET)
  - Summer (DST): UTC+02:00 (CEST)
- Postal codes: 15837
- Dialling codes: 033704
- Vehicle registration: TF

Paplitz (German: [ˈpaːpˌlɪts]) is a village, part of the town of Baruth/Mark and a former municipality in the Teltow-Fläming district, in Brandenburg, Germany. It is situated in the Glogau-Baruther Urstromtal at the border of the Fläming Heath, 3 km west of Baruth and 53 km south of Berlin.

== History ==
Paplitz, like most places in Brandenburg, was originally a Slavic settlement. It was first mentioned in a charter of the Bishopric of Brandenburg in 1363. Its name may derive from the Wendish term Popelicz meaning poplar grove.

Since 31 December 2001, Paplitz is part of the town of Baruth.
