= Wilhelm von Humboldt =

German philosopher (1767–1835)

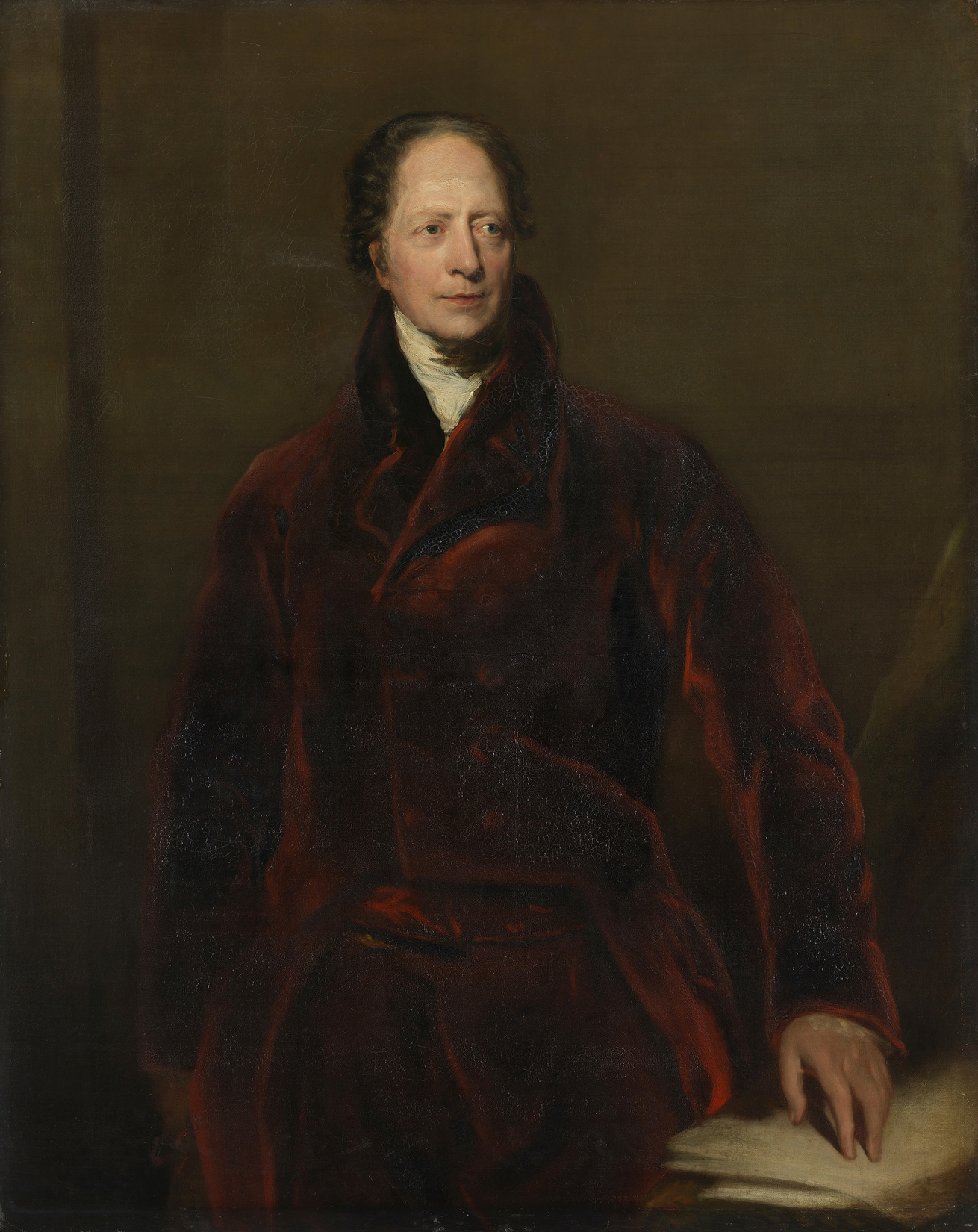
- Portrait by Thomas Lawrence
- Born: 22 June 1767; Potsdam, Prussia
- Died: 8 April 1835 (aged 67); Tegel, Prussia
- Spouse: Caroline von Dacheröden

Education
- Education: University of Frankfurt (Oder); University of Göttingen
- Academic advisor: C. G. Heyne

Philosophical work
- Era: 19th-century philosophy
- Region: Western philosophy
- School: Berlin Romanticism; Romantic linguistics Classical liberalism
- Institutions: University of Berlin
- Main interests: Philosophy of language
- Notable ideas: Language as a rule-governed system ("the inner form of language"); Humboldtian model of higher education

Friedrich Wilhelm Christian Karl Ferdinand von Humboldt (Note: /ˈhʌmboʊlt/, also US: /ˈhʊmboʊlt/, UK: /ˈhʌmbɒlt/; German: [ˈvɪlhɛlm fɔn ˈhʊmbɔlt]) (22 June 1767 – 8 April 1835) was a German philosopher, linguist, government functionary, diplomat, and founder of the Humboldt University of Berlin. In 1949, the university was named after him and his younger brother, Alexander von Humboldt, a naturalist.

He was a linguist who made contributions to the philosophy of language, ethnolinguistics, and to the theory and practice of education. He made a major contribution to the development of liberalism by envisioning education as a means of realizing individual possibility rather than a way of drilling traditional ideas into youth to suit them for an already established occupation or social role. In particular, he was the architect of the Humboldtian education ideal, which was used from the beginning in Prussia as a model for its system of public education, as well as in the United States and Japan. He was elected as a member of the American Philosophical Society in 1822.

== Biography ==
Humboldt was born in Potsdam, Margraviate of Brandenburg, and died in Tegel, Province of Brandenburg.

His father, Alexander Georg von Humboldt (1720–1779), belonged to a prominent German noble family from Pomerania. Although not one of the titled gentry, he was a major in the Prussian Army, who had served with the Duke of Brunswick. At age 42, Alexander Georg was rewarded for his services in the Seven Years' War with the post of royal chamberlain. He profited from the contract to lease state lotteries and tobacco sales.

Wilhelm's grandfather was Johann Paul von Humboldt (1684–1740), who married Sophia Dorothea von Schweder (1688–1749), daughter of Prussian General Adjutant Michael von Schweder (1663–1729). In 1766, his father, Alexander Georg married Maria Elisabeth Colomb, a well-educated woman and widow of Baron Friedrich Ernst von Holwede (1723–1765), with whom she had a son Heinrich Friedrich Ludwig Ferdinand (1762–1817). Alexander Georg and Maria Elisabeth had four children: two daughters, Karoline and Gabriele, who died young, and then two sons, Wilhelm and Alexander. Her first-born son Heinrich, Wilhelm and Alexander's half-brother, Rittmaster in the Gendarme regiment was something of a ne'er do well, not often mentioned in the family history.

== Personal life ==
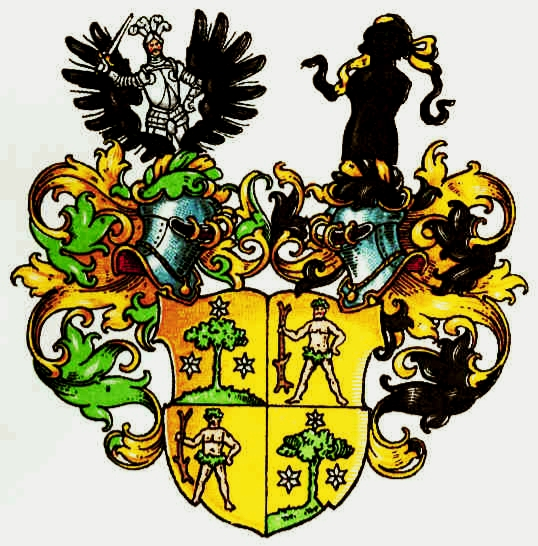
Coat of arms of the Barons von Humboldt-Dacheröden

In June 1791, Humboldt married Caroline von Dacheröden. They had eight children, of whom five (amongst them Gabriele von Humboldt) survived to adulthood.

The alliance of these two German noble families created a distinct branch whose descendants bore the combined name von Humboldt-Dacheröden, having been created Barons in the Kingdom of Prussia by Wilhelm I in 1875.

== Philosopher ==
Humboldt was a philosopher; he wrote The Limits of State Action in 1791–1792 (though it was not published until 1850, after Humboldt's death), one of the boldest defences of the liberties of the Enlightenment. It influenced John Stuart Mill's essay On Liberty (1859) through which von Humboldt's ideas became known in the English-speaking world. Humboldt outlined an early version of what Mill would later call the "harm principle". His house in Rome became a cultural hub, run by Caroline von Humboldt.

The section dealing with education was published in the December 1792 issue of the Berlinische Monatsschrift under the title "On public state education". With this publication, Humboldt took part in the philosophical debate regarding the direction of national education that was in progress in Germany, as elsewhere, after the French Revolution.

== Educational reforms ==
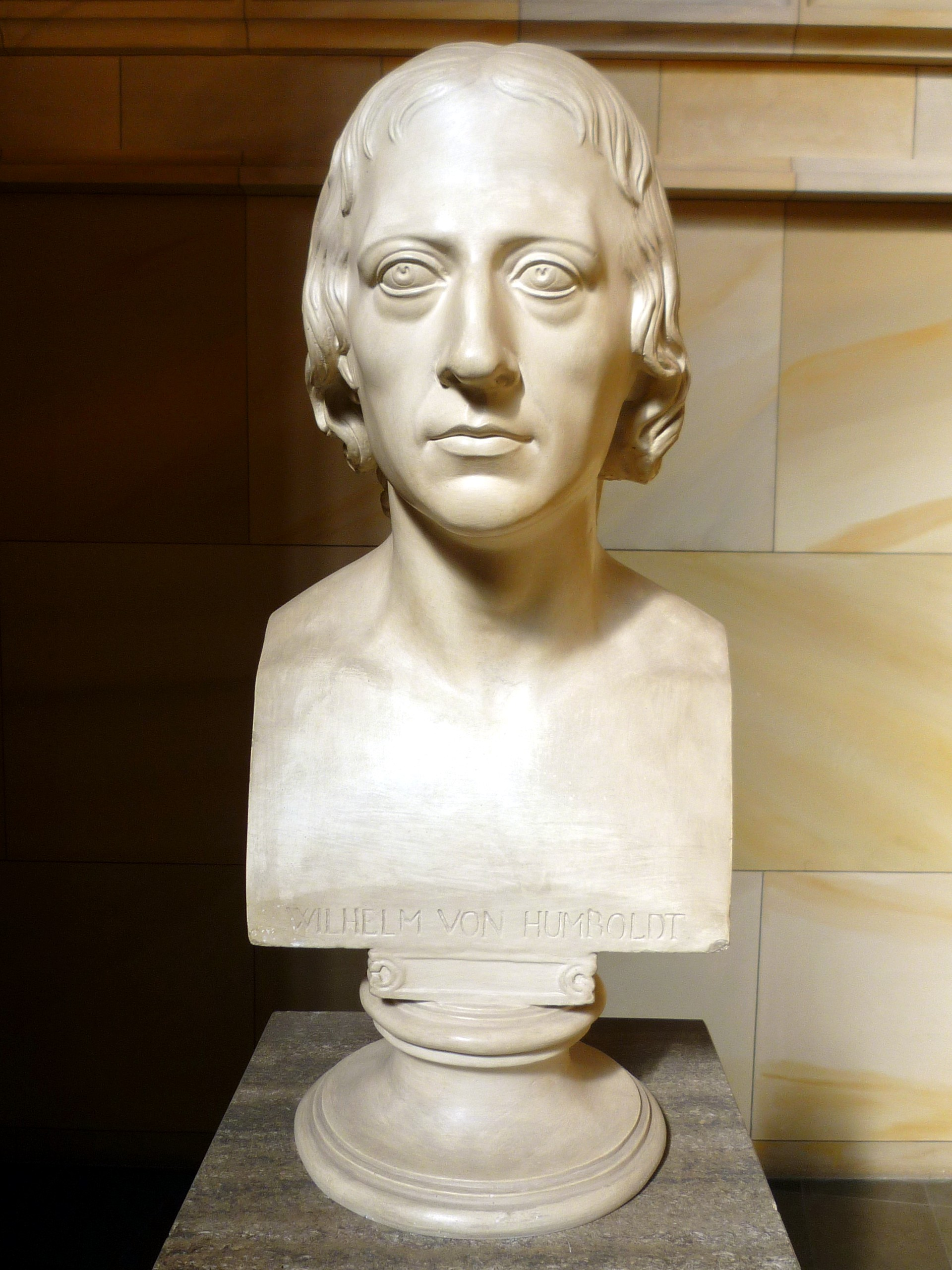
Bust of Wilhelm von Humboldt by Bertel Thorvaldsen, 1808

Humboldt had been home schooled and never finished his comparatively short university studies at the universities of Frankfurt (Oder) and Göttingen. Nevertheless, he became one of the most influential officials in German education. Actually, Humboldt had intended to become Minister of education, but failed to attain that position. The Prussian King asked him to leave Rome in 1809 and to lead the directorate of education under Friedrich Ferdinand Alexander zu Dohna-Schlobitten. Humboldt did not reply to the appointment for several weeks and would have preferred to stay on at the embassy in Rome. His wife did not return with him to Prussia; the couple met again when Humboldt stepped down from the educational post and was appointed head of the Embassy in Vienna.

Humboldt installed a standardized system of public instruction, from basic schools till secondary education, and founded Berlin University. He imposed a standardization of state examinations and inspections and created a special department within the ministry to oversee and design curricula, textbooks and learning aids.

Humboldt's educational model went beyond vocational training. In a letter to the Prussian king, he wrote: "There are undeniably certain kinds of knowledge that must be of a general nature and, more importantly, a certain cultivation of the mind and character that nobody can afford to be without. People obviously cannot be good craftworkers, merchants, soldiers or businessmen unless, regardless of their occupation, they are good, upstanding and – according to their condition – well-informed human beings and citizens. If this basis is laid through schooling, vocational skills are easily acquired later on, and a person is always free to move from one occupation to another, as so often happens in life." The philosopher Julian Nida-Rümelin has criticized discrepancies between Humboldt's ideals and modern European education policy, which narrowly understands education as a preparation for the labor market, and argued that we need to decide between McKinsey and Humboldt.

== Diplomat ==
As a successful diplomat between 1802 and 1819, Humboldt was plenipotentiary Prussian minister at Rome from 1802, ambassador at Vienna from 1812 during the closing struggles of the Napoleonic Wars, at the congress of Prague (1813) where he was instrumental in drawing Austria to ally with Prussia and Russia against Napoleon; a signer of the peace treaty at Paris and the treaty between Prussia and defeated Saxony (1815), and at the congress at Aachen in 1818. However, the increasingly reactionary policy of the Prussian government made him give up political life in 1819; and from that time forward he devoted himself solely to literature and study.

== Linguist ==
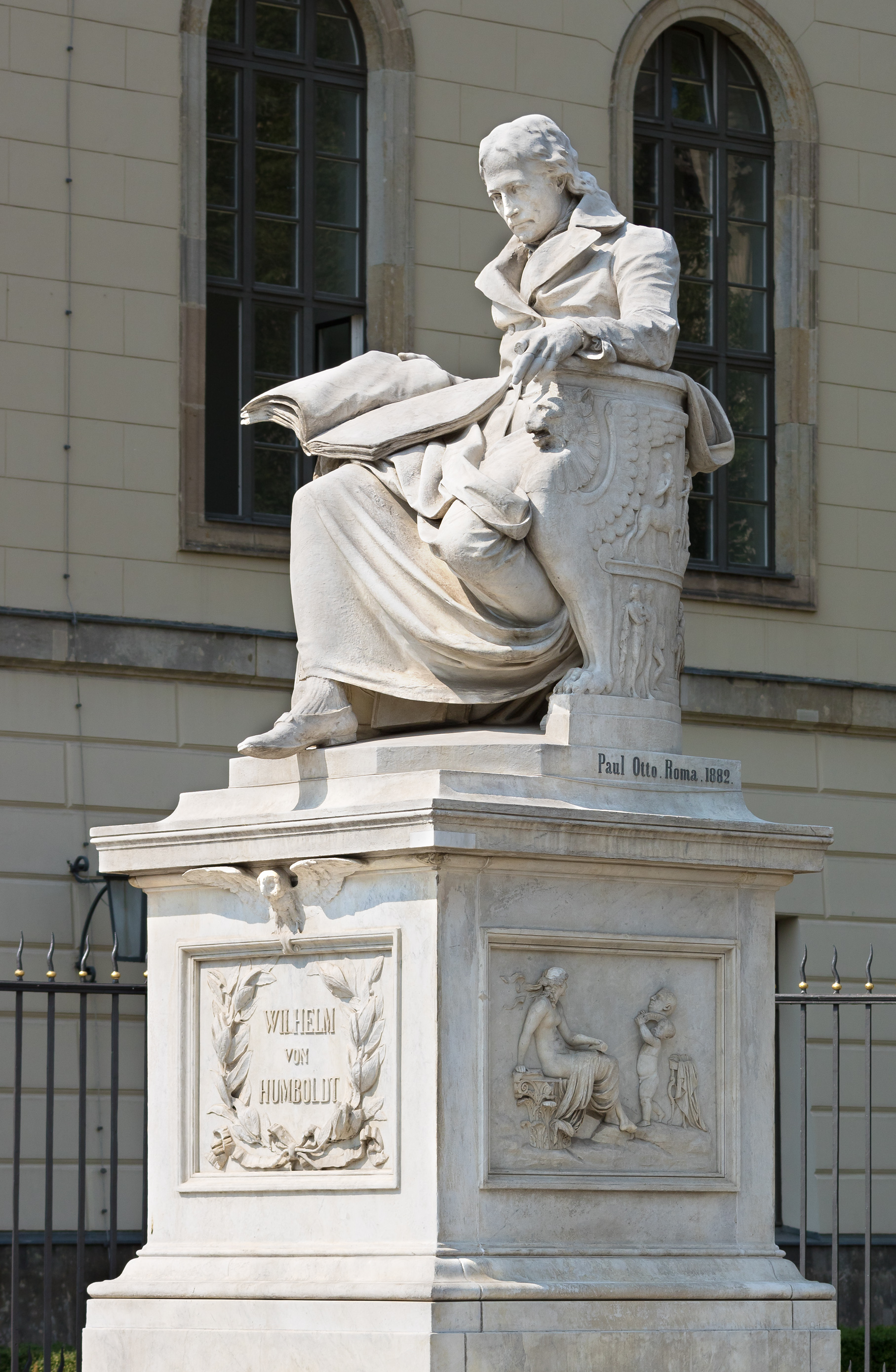
Statue of Wilhelm von Humboldt outside Humboldt University, Unter den Linden, Berlin

Wilhelm von Humboldt was an adept linguist and studied the Basque language. He translated Pindar and Aeschylus into German.

Humboldt's work as a philologist in Basque has had more extensive impact than his other work. His two visits to the Basque country resulted in Researches into the Early Inhabitants of Spain by the help of the Basque language (1821). In this work, Humboldt endeavored to show by examining geographical placenames that at one time a race or races speaking dialects allied to modern Basque extended throughout Spain, southern France and the Balearic Islands; he identified these people with the Iberians of classical writers, and further surmised that they had been allied with the Berbers of northern Africa. Humboldt's pioneering work has been superseded in its details by modern linguistics and archaeology, but is sometimes still uncritically followed even today. He was elected a member of the American Antiquarian Society in 1820, and a Foreign Honorary Member of the American Academy of Arts and Sciences in 1822.

Humboldt died while preparing his greatest work, on the ancient Kawi language of Java, but its introduction was published in 1836 as The Heterogeneity of Language and its Influence on the Intellectual Development of Mankind. His 1836 book on the philosophy of speech introduces the concept of "the inner form of language" (according to Encyclopædia Britannica 1911):

[F]irst clearly laid down that the character and structure of a language expresses the inner life and knowledge of its speakers, and that languages must differ from one another in the same way and to the same degree as those who use them. Sounds do not become words until a meaning has been put into them, and this meaning embodies the thought of a community. What Humboldt terms the inner form of a language is just that mode of denoting the relations between the parts of a sentence which reflects the manner in which a particular body of men regards the world about them. It is the task of the morphology of speech to distinguish the various ways in which languages differ from each other as regards their inner form, and to classify and arrange them accordingly.

Noam Chomsky frequently quotes Humboldt's description of language as a rule-governed system which "makes infinite use of finite means", meaning that an infinite number of sentences can be created using a finite number of grammatical rules. However, Humboldt scholar Tilman Borsche cautions that profound differences remain between von Humboldt's view of language, and Chomsky's.

More recently, Humboldt has also been credited as an originator of the linguistic relativity hypothesis (more commonly known as the Sapir–Whorf hypothesis), developed by linguists Edward Sapir or Benjamin Whorf a century later.

The reception of Humboldt's work remains problematic in English-speaking countries, despite the work of Langham Brown, Manchester and James W. Underhill (Humboldt, Worldview and Language, 2009), due to his concept of (what he termed) Weltansicht, the "linguistic worldview", while Weltanschauung is translated simply as 'worldview'—a term associated with ideologies and cultural mindsets in both German and English. The centrality of this distinction in understanding Humboldt's work was set out by one of the leading contemporary German Humboldt scholars, Jürgen Trabant, in his works in both German and French. Polish linguists at the Lublin School (see Jerzy Bartmiński), in their research of Humboldt, also stress this distinction between the worldviews of a personal or political kind, and the worldview that is implicit in language as a conceptual system.

However, there has been, in English, a comparative dearth of rigorous research that explores the relationship between the linguistic worldview and the transformation and maintenance of this worldview by individual speakers. One notable exception is the work of Underhill, who explores comparative linguistic studies in both Creating Worldviews: Language, Ideology & Metaphor (2011) and in Ethnolinguistics and Cultural Concepts: Truth, Love, Hate & War (2012). In Underhill's work, a distinction is made between five forms of worldview—world-perceiving, world-conceiving, cultural mindset, personal world, and perspective—in order to convey the distinctions Humboldt was concerned with preserving in his ethnolinguistics. Probably the best-known linguist working with a truly Humboldtian perspective writing in English today is Anna Wierzbicka, who has published a number of comparative works on semantic universals and conceptual distinctions in language.

The Rouen Ethnolinguistics Project, in France, published online a 7-hour series of lectures on Humboldt's thought on language, with the Berlin specialist Professor Trabant.

In Charles Taylor's important summative work, The Language Animal: The Full Shape of the Human Linguistic Capacity (2016), von Humboldt is given credit, along with Johann Georg Hamann and Johann Gottfried Herder, for inspiring Taylor's "HHH" approach to the philosophy of language, emphasizing the creative power and cultural specificity of language.

== Bibliography ==
- Socrates and Plato on the Divine (orig. Sokrates und Platon über die Gottheit). 1787–1790
- Humboldt. On the Limits of State Action , first seen in 1792. Ideen zu einem Versuch, die Grenzen der Wirksamkeit des Staates zu bestimmen, p. ii. Published by E. Trewendt, 1851 (German)
- Ueber den Geschlechtsunterschied. 1794
- Ueber männliche und weibliche Form. 1795
- Outline of a Comparative Anthropology (orig. Plan einer vergleichenden Anthropologie). 1797.
- The Eighteenth Century (orig. Das achtzehnte Jahrhundert). = 1797.
- Ästhetische Versuche I. – Ueber Göthes Herrmann und Dorothea. 1799.
- Latium und Hellas (1806)
- Geschichte des Verfalls und Untergangs der griechischen Freistaaten. 1807–1808.
- Pindars "Olympische Oden". Translation from Greek, 1816.
- Aischylos' "Agamemnon". Translation from Greek, 1816.
- Ueber das vergleichende Sprachstudium in Beziehung auf die verschiedenen Epochen der Sprachentwicklung. 1820.
- Ueber die Aufgabe des Geschichtsschreibers. 1821.
- Researches into the Early Inhabitants of Spain with the help of the Basque language (orig. Prüfung der Untersuchungen über die Urbewohner Hispaniens vermittelst der vaskischen Sprache). 1821.
- Ueber die Entstehung der grammatischen Formen und ihren Einfluss auf die Ideenentwicklung. 1822.
- Upon Writing and its Relation to Speech (orig. Ueber die Buchstabenschrift und ihren Zusammenhang mit dem Sprachbau). 1824.
- Notice sur la grammaire japonaise du P. Oyanguren (1826), a review of Melchor Oyanguren de Santa Inés's Japanese grammar, read online.
- Ueber die unter dem Namen Bhagavad-Gítá bekannte Episode des Mahá-Bhárata. 1826.
- Ueber den Dualis. 1827.
- On the languages of the South Seas (orig. Über die Sprache der Südseeinseln). 1828.
- On Schiller and the Path of Spiritual Development (orig. Ueber Schiller und den Gang seiner Geistesentwicklung). 1830.
- Rezension von Goethes Zweitem römischem Aufenthalt. 1830.
- The Heterogeneity of Language and its Influence on the Intellectual Development of Mankind (orig. Ueber die Verschiedenheit des menschlichen Sprachbaus und ihren Einfluss auf die geistige Entwicklung des Menschengeschlechts). 1836. New edition: On Language. On the Diversity of Human Language Construction and Its Influence on the Mental Development of the Human Species, Cambridge University Press, 2nd rev. edition 1999

=== Collected writings ===
- Humboldt, Wilhelm von. Gesammelte Schriften. Ausgabe der preussischen Akademie der Wissenschaften. Vols. I–XVII, Berlin 1903–36. (Cited as GS; the Roman numeral indicates the volume and the Arabic figure the page; the original German spelling has been modernized.)

== See also ==
- Contributions to liberal theory
- Friedrich Gottlieb Welcker (epistolary correspondent)

== Sources ==
- de Terra, Helmut (1955). Humboldt: The Life and Times of Alexander von Humboldt, 1769–1859. New York: Alfred A. Knopf. OCLC 902143803.

| Preceded by Count Friedrich von Schuckmann | Interior Minister of Prussia; 1819 | Succeeded by Count Friedrich von Schuckmann |
