= Alexander von Humboldt (disambiguation) =

Alexander von Humboldt was a German naturalist and explorer.

Alexander von Humboldt may also refer to:

== Schools and research institutions ==
- Alexander von Humboldt Biological Resources Research Institute, Colombia
- Alexander von Humboldt Institute for Internet and Society, Berlin, Germany
- List of schools named after Alexander von Humboldt

== Ships ==
- Alexander von Humboldt (ship), a German tall ship
- Alexander von Humboldt II, a German tall ship built in 2011 as the successor of the above
- MS Alexander von Humboldt (2005), a cruise ship formerly operated by Phoenix Reisen
- MS Alexander von Humboldt, formerly Crown Monarch, a cruise ship formerly operated by Phoenix Reisen, as of 2011 operated by the Turkish tour operator Bamtur
- Alexander von Humboldt (dredging ship), a Belgian dredging vessel owned by Jan De Nul
- CMA CGM Alexander von Humboldt, a containership

== Sculptures ==
- Alexander von Humboldt Memorial, Berlin, Germany
- Statue of Alexander von Humboldt (Tiergarten, Berlin)
- Statue of Alexander von Humboldt (Mexico City), Mexico
- Statue of Alexander von Humboldt (Chicago), United States
- Statue of Alexander von Humboldt (Philadelphia), United States
- Statue of Alexander von Humboldt (Stanford University), United States

== Other uses ==
- Alexander von Humboldt National Forest, Peru
- Alexander von Humboldt Foundation, a foundation promoting international cooperation in the field of scientific research
  - Alexander von Humboldt Professorship, an award presented by the foundation
- Alexander von Humboldt Medal, awarded by the International Association for Vegetation Science
- Alexander von Humboldt Medal (EGU), awarded annually by the European Geosciences Union

== See also ==
- Alejandro de Humboldt National Park, Cuba
- Universidad Alejandro de Humboldt, a private Venezuelan university
