= Islander =

Islander, Islanders, or The Islanders may refer to:

== People ==
- Islander, referring to Jersey people
- Islander, New Zealand-English term usually meaning Pacific Islander
- Islander, referring to someone from Prince Edward Island, Canada
- Islander or Long Islander, referring to someone from Long Island, New York

== Arts, entertainment, and media ==
=== Literature ===
- The Islander (Rylant novel), 1998 children's fantasy novel by Cynthia Rylant
- The Islander, 1962 novel by Allan Campbell McLean Niven Award
- The Islander, 2012 translation by Seán Ó Coileáin of the 1929 Irish autobiography of Tomas O'Crohan
- The Islanders (Leskov novel), an 1866 Russian novel by Nikolai Leskov
- The Islanders (Priest novel), a 2011 British science fiction novel by Christopher Priest
- The Islandman, 1937 translation by Robin Flower of Tomas O'Crohan's autobiography

=== Film and television ===
- Islander (film), a 2006 film directed by Ian McCrudden
- The Islander (film), an upcoming film starring Harry Connick Jr.
- The Islanders (TV series), an adventure television series from 1960 to 1961
- The Islander, a 1978 TV film directed by Paul Krasny

=== Music ===
==== Groups ====
- Islander (band), American rock/post-hardcore band
- The Islanders (American band), fl. 1959
- Danny and the Islanders, a Finnish group
- Jon Lilygreen and the Islanders, see Cyprus in the Eurovision Song Contest 2010

==== Albums ====
- Islander (album), 2014 recording by Jarle Bernhoft
- Islanders (album), an album by York
- The Islander (album), 1998 recording by Dave Dobbyn

==== Songs ====
- "The Islander" (song), a 2007 song by Nightwish
- "Islander", a song by Ionnalee from her 2019 album Remember the Future

=== Periodicals ===
- The Islander (Australian newspaper), published on Kangaroo Island since 1967
- The Islander, a Prince Edward Island newspaper founded in 1842 in Canada
- The Islander, the only newspaper of Ascension Island
- The Islander, a newspaper in Massachusetts that began in 1840
- The Islander, Anna Maria Island, Florida
- The Islander, newspaper published in North Hero, Vermont since 1974
- The Islander, a Victoria, British Columbia newspaper started in 1952

=== Other uses in arts, entertainment, and media ===
- Islanders (video game), a 2019 video game by Grizzly Games
- Adventure Island (video game), known in India as Islander

== Boats ==
- Islander 21, an American sailboat design
- Islander 24, an American sailboat design
- Islander 24 Bahama, an American sailboat design
- Islander 36, an American sailboat design
- Islander 40, an American sailboat design
- Islander (steamboat), active in the early 1900s on Puget Sound
- Islander (yawl), the second boat sailed around the world single-handedly
- MV Islander, a ferry on Vineyard Sound
- MV Islander (2005), a ferry operating between the UK and Guernsey with Brittany Ferries.
- SS Islander, a sunken ship that once carried Klondike gold

== Sports ==
- Harrisburg City Islanders, an American soccer team later known as Penn FC, 2003–2019
- Islanders FC, a British Virgin Islands football club
- New York Islanders, professional hockey team in the NHL
- Bridgeport Islanders, professional hockey team in the AHL
- Pacific Islanders rugby union team, 2004–2008
- Puerto Rico Islanders, football club in Puerto Rico, 2003–2012
- Texas A&M–Corpus Christi Islanders, the athletic program of Texas A&M University–Corpus Christi
- The Islanders (professional wrestling), 1986–1988
- The Wild Samoans, a professional wrestling tag team known at various times during the 1970s as The Islanders

== Other uses ==
- Islander (database) integrative islands in prokaryotic genomes
- Britten-Norman Islander, a twin-engine light aircraft
- Islander Hotel, Papua New Guinea
