= Statue of Alexander von Humboldt =

Statue of Alexander von Humboldt may refer to:

- Statue of Alexander von Humboldt (Begas)
- Statue of Alexander von Humboldt (Bläser)
- Statue of Alexander von Humboldt (Chicago)
- Statue of Alexander von Humboldt (Mexico City)
- Statue of Alexander von Humboldt (Philadelphia)
- Statue of Alexander von Humboldt (Stanford University)
