= Com-Pac 25 =

Sailboat class

Development
- Designer: Hutchins Group
- Location: United States
- Builder: Columbia Yachts
- Name: Com-Pac 25

Boat
- Displacement: 4,800 lb (2,177 kg)
- Draft: 2.50 ft (0.76 m)

Hull
- Type: Monohull
- Construction: Fiberglass
- LOA: 28.17 ft (8.59 m)
- LWL: 21.00 ft (6.40 m)
- Beam: 8.50 ft (2.59 m)

Hull appendages
- Keel: fin keel
- Ballast: 1,900 lb (862 kg)
- Rudder: internally-mounted spade-type rudder

Rig
- Rig type: Bermuda rig

Sails
- Sailplan: Masthead sloop
- Total sail area: 265.00 sq ft (24.619 m^{2})

The Com-Pac 25 is an American trailerable sailboat that was designed as a cruiser.

The Com-Pac 25 is a development of the Watkins 25, which was based upon the molds for the Columbia 24, which in turn came from the Islander 24.

== Production ==
The design was built by Com-Pac Yachts in the United States, but it is now out of production. It was adapted by Com-Pac Yachts owner W.L. Hutchins.

== Design ==
The Com-Pac 25 is a recreational keelboat, built predominantly of fiberglass, with wood trim. It has a masthead sloop rig, a raked stem, a near-plumb transom, an internally mounted spade-type rudder controlled by a tiller and a fixed fin keel. Wheel steering was a factory option. The boat displaces 4,800 lb (2,177 kg) and carries 1,900 lb (862 kg) of ballast.

The boat has a draft of 2.50 ft (0.76 m) with the standard keel fitted.

The boat is normally fitted with a small 6 to 12 hp (4 to 9 kW) outboard motor for docking and maneuvering, although an inboard diesel engine of 12 hp (9 kW), was optional.

The design has sleeping accommodation for five people, with a double "V"-berth in the bow cabin and two straight settee quarter berths in the main cabin and an aft cabin with a single berth on the port side. The galley is located on the starboard side just aft of the companionway ladder. The galley is L-shaped and is equipped with a stove and a sink. The enclosed head is located just aft of the bow cabin on the port side. The fresh water tank has a capacity of 20 U.S. gallons (76 L; 17 imp gal). Cabin headroom is 70 in (180 cm).

The design has a hull speed of 6.1 kn (11.3 km/h).

== Operational history ==
In a 2010 review Steve Henkel wrote, "the Com-Pac 25 offers accommodations for five, 5' 10" headroom, a big folding galley table that flips down from the bulkhead, and a private enclosed head. She has an 8' 6" beam, which is wider than her comps, but still road-legal in the United States. So all you need is a big enough tow vehicle (and that no longer means 'any full-size car'; try a big truck or van with a tow package and extra power). There are six bronze opening ports with screens for ventilation; and there's plenty of teak and teak veneer in the cabin. Options include a two-cylinder 12-horse-power freshwater cooled inboard diesel, and Edson wheel steering, Best features: Her Space Index and her headroom are both highest among her comp[etitor]s. Worst features: Her mainsail is less than 40 percent of her total sail area, which makes sail handling easier but limits overall power, especially sailing downwind. Inboard sheeting might improve the boat's windward performance, according to one reviewer."

== See also ==
- List of sailing boat types

Related development

- Watkins 25
- Columbia 24
- Islander 24
