= Watkins Yachts =

Sailboat manufacturer

- Company type: Privately held company
- Industry: Boat building
- Founded: 1973
- Founder: Watkins brothers
- Defunct: 1989
- Headquarters: United States
- Products: Sailboats
- Owner: McLaughlin Body Company

Watkins Yachts and Marine was an American boat builder, based in Clearwater, Florida. The company specialized in the design and manufacture of fiberglass sailboats.

The company was founded by the four Watkins brothers, Redford, Richard, Robert and Gary in 1973 and ceased operations while a division of the McLaughlin Body Company in 1989.

== History ==
The company was founded by the four Watkins brothers in 1973 in a small rented facility, with the first sailboat, the Watkins 23 introduced that same following year. The 23 was a modified version of the Helsen 22, produced with permission of the designer and owner of Helsen Yachts, Johannes Helsen. In 1977 the design was modified with a fiberglass interior and headliner and was re-designated as the Watkins 23 XL.

The brothers assumed company responsibilities: Redford Watkins was in charge of advertising, Richard Watkins production, Robert Watkins purchasing and Gary Watkins handled sales. The company was launched right after the Arab oil embargo and the resulting 1973 oil crisis and sailboats sold well in the economic conditions of the time, providing quick success for the fledgling company.

The Watkins 17 was introduced in 1975 as a one-design racer. Most of the boats built went to a single sailing club.

Naval architect Walter Scott was enlisted to assist with the Watkins 27 design in 1977. The boat became a quick commercial success, with 514 copies of the design built, making it the company's best seller. It competed in the same market as the Catalina 27. In 1981 a pilothouse version was made available as the Watkins 27P, although only seven were built.

The company had been producing fewer than 50 boats per years, but the simultaneous building of three different models by 1977 required larger facilities and the company purchased an existing building that was renovated and improved for boat production. Separate areas were established for a fiberglass shop and final assembly. In 1978, 160 Watkins 27s alone were sold. By 1979 the company had more than 20 dealers.

In the late 1970s the industry suffered from two effects, high interest rates and market saturation of a product that did not wear out. The brothers decided to sell the company to a new investor from Chicago in August 1979, having built almost 600 boats over the six years since the company founding.

The company was merged with boat building company, Auroraglas which had been bought by the same investor. The former owner of Auroraglas, Al Larson then became president of Watkins Yachts. The company bought the molds and tooling for the Columbia Yachts and Coronado series of designs after that company went out of business. The Watkins 36, Watkins 32 and Watkins 25 were all modified from Columbia designs. The company acquired the rights to the Portman 36 and modified it to become the Watkins 36C with a center cockpit and the Watkins 36AC with an aft cockpit.

The new company needed new management with the departure of the Watkins brothers and Larson hired Dennis Robbins as the production manager. Larson had known Robbins from his time at Endeavour Yachts. He also hired an experienced fiberglass shop supervisor whom Robbins had worked with at Irwin Yachts. Larson assumed the sales and design duties. The smaller boats were phased out, including the 17 and 23XL models. Only one 17 and four 23s were completed under the new management.

In 1982 the investor sold his share of the company to Larson and the Watkins 32 was introduced, replacing the 36 in the line. In 1983 the Watkins 23 was introduced, derived from the Columbia T-23. In 1984 the 27 was replaced with the Watkins 29, which was a modification of the 27 design. The Watkins 32 was modified in 1984 with a reverse transom and redesigned interior to become the Watkins 33. The Watkins 36 ceased production.

In 1986 the company was purchased by the McLaughlin Body Company and the sailboat line was renamed Seawolf. The company changed its emphasis to power boats and sailboat production dropped to only one or two per month. In 1988 the Watkins 29 received a reverse transom similar to the 33 as was renamed the Watkins 30. Production of the Watkins branded boats ending in November 1989, with a total of 1491 boats built.

The company was wound up by its parent company, with the power boat line sold to a Grand Cayman Island company in about 1991 and the remaining sailboat line sold to a local businessman who was not able to restart production. Some of the sailboat tooling was sold, the Watkins 25 tooling was sold to Compaq Yachts and it was modified to become the Compac 25. Much of the remaining molds were scrapped and the building was sold to a plumbing supply contractor.

The McLaughlin Body Company remains in business, but no longer produces watercraft.

== Boats ==
Summary of boats built by Watkins Yachts, by year:

- Watkins 23 - 1973
- Watkins 17 - 1975
- Watkins 27 - 1977
- Watkins 23 XL - 1977
- Portman 36 - 1979
- Watkins 27P - 1981
- Watkins 36 - 1981
- Watkins 36C - 1981
- Watkins 32 - 1982
- Watkins 29 - 1984
- Seawolf 33 - 1984
- Watkins 33 - 1984
- Watkins 25 - 1985
- Watkins 30 - 1987

== See also ==
- List of sailboat designers and manufacturers
