= Ilwaco (steamship) =

American ship, built 1890

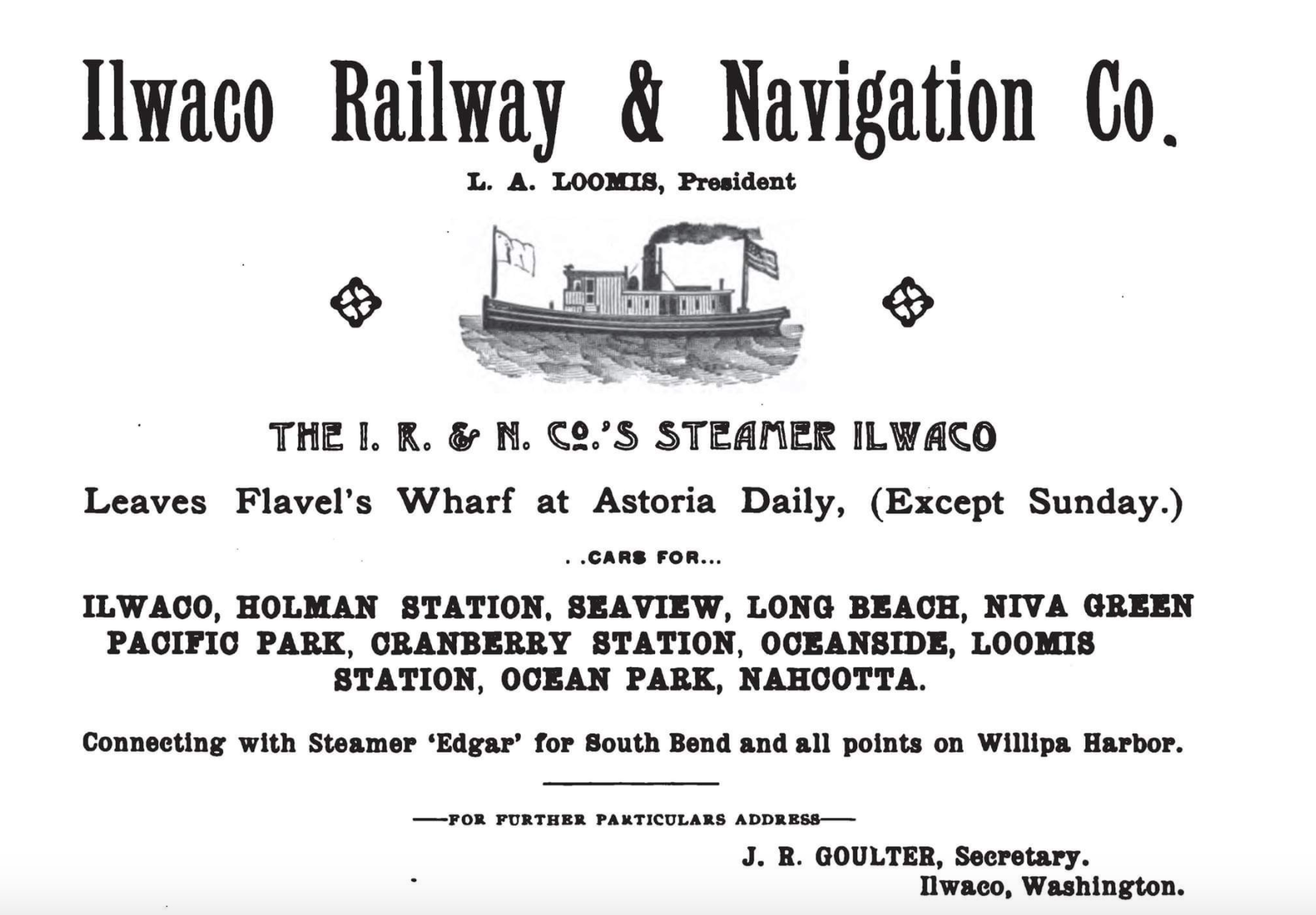
- Advertisement for steamer Ilwaco, circa 1895.

History
- Name: Suomi (1890–1891); Ilwaco (1891–1918)
- Owner: Ilwaco Rwy & Nav. Co.
- Route: Columbia River, San Juan Islands, Puget Sound, San Francisco Bay, Inside Passage
- In service: 1890
- Out of service: 1918
- Fate: Wrecked in Chatham Sound November 5, 1918

General characteristics
- Type: Riverine / coastal all-purpose
- Length: 90 ft (27.43 m)
- Beam: 17 ft (5.18 m)
- Depth: 6 ft (1.83 m) depth of hold
- Installed power: original : steam engine, cylinder bores 16 in (40.6 cm); stroke 16 in (40.6 cm); later: gasoline engine.
- Propulsion: propeller
- Sail plan: .

Ilwaco was a small riverine and coastal steamship built in 1890 which was operated as a passenger vessel for the Ilwaco Railway and Navigation Company, and later served in other roles, including tow and freight boat, cannery tender and fish packing vessel. Ilwaco was originally named Suomi.

Ilwaco served in several areas of the Pacific Northwest, including the Columbia River, the San Juan Islands, Puget Sound. Ilwaco also served coastal areas near San Francisco Bay, and the Inside Passage in Alaska. Ilwaco was wrecked in 1918 at Green Island, in Chatham Sound, not far from Prince Rupert, British Columbia, in the Inside Passage.

== Construction ==
The steamer Suomi, constructed at Chinook, WA in 1890 for B. A. Seaborg, was purchased by the Ilwaco Railway & Navigation Company in 1891 and renamed Ilwaco. In April 1890, it was reported that Suomi was nearly ready to begin service on the Astoria-Ilwaco run, under the command of Captain Herbert Petit.

== Dimensions and power ==
According to official measurements in 1893, Suomi / Ilwaco was 90 ft (27.4 m) long, with a beam of 17 ft (5.2 m) and depth of hold of 6 ft (1.8 m). Gross tonnage was 115, and net tonnage was 66. "Ton" in this instance was a unit of volume and not of weight. The merchant vessel registry number was 100514. According to the official registry, the steamer was built in Portland, Oregon and not in Chinook, Washington. The boiler was wood-fired.

== Suomi on the Astoria-Ilwaco route ==
Suomi ran twice daily, Sundays excepted, from the Main Street wharf in Astoria, to Tansy Point (near Warrenton), Fort Stevens, and then, on the Washington side of the river, Fort Canby, and Ilwaco, departing Astoria, at 8:00 a.m. and 2:30 p.m. Passengers disembarking at Ilwaco would be taken by coach to the beach. The fare for the round trip was fifty cents.

Suomi was substituted for the General Canby on the Ilwaco route, and remained on the run, in charge of Captains William Starr, Thomas Parker, and Engineer Charles Smith.

== Operations as Ilwaco on Columbia ==
As of December 1894, Captain Parker was master Ilwaco. In February 1893, Ilwaco was advertised to be departing Astoria, Oregon daily at 7:30 a.m. bound for Ilwaco, Washington, stopping at Tanzy (also spelled "Tansy") Point before arriving in Ilwaco at 10:00 a.m., where it met the northbound train.

The rail line then ran to Nahcotta, Washington, where it ran out a dock to make connections with steamers, running to points on Willapa Bay, South Bend, Sunshine, North Cove, and Grays Harbor.

The route from Ilwaco zig-zagged around the many fish traps on the Columbia before it could reach the main channel of the river. In July 1895 Ilwaco made connections at Astoria with the large fast steamers Telephone and Bailey Gatzert, both owned by the White Collar Line, on the Portland-Astoria run.

=== Stranding of Kentmere ===
On November 24, 1894, when the British ship Kentmere went aground on the south side of the Columbia bar, Ilwaco carried the Fort Canby life-boat crew to Sand Island to stand by to effect a rescue.

=== Local dissatisfaction ===
Their Elegant Steam Tub Leaves Astoria every day that she can escape the eagle eye of the Inspectors. Passengers are required to furnish themselves with life preservers, and to take their own risks, and also a pair of stilts in case of low water on the spit.
Notice--A spotter is employed on every train, to prevent beach visitors from being robbed by the Ilwaco Councilmen and attorney, while en route through the city. Keep on the train and no danger need be apprehended from that source. Passengers alighting in Ilwaco do so at their own risk. Pacific Journal, 1893

In July 1895 there was talk that the side-wheel steamer North Pacific, with a capacity of 350 passengers, would replace Ilwaco on the Astoria-Ilwaco run. Up to that time Ilwaco had been the only vessel on the run, and it had then recently, on April 28, 1895, hauled out of the water for service, including replacement of the wheel and shaft and a new coat of paint.

The prospect of replacement of Ilwaco with North Pacific was welcomed by the Daily Astorian, which described Ilwaco as "a very small light craft [which] accorded the patrons inadequate facilities for comfort."

The editor of the Ilwaco newspaper Pacific Journal was dissatisfied with the steamboat service of the Ilwaco Railway & Navigation Company, publishing a sardonic "advertisement" for the line, at right.

=== Later service ===
In the fall of 1899 Ilwaco was engaged in towing work, bringing a barge laden with lumber into Goble, Oregon on September 15. In 1899 the Cook Canning Company bought Ilwaco, with the intent of transferring it to Port Townsend to be used as a cannery tender.

== Transfer to Puget Sound ==
=== Reconstruction in Portland ===
In February 1900, Ilwaco was brought to the Supple ship yard in Portland for work on its engines. The steamer remained under repair until April, when it was remeasured by Deputy Barnes of the Steamboat Inspection Service. Ilwaco had been rebuilt with new house. After reconstruction, it measured out at 90 ft (27.4 m) length, 17 ft (5.2 m) beam, and 6 ft (1.8 m) depth of hold. The steamer's overall size was 106 gross and 22 net tons, with "ton" being a unit of volume in this instance and not of weight.

The rebuilt Ilwaco was launched from the Supple yard on the Monday, May 17, 1900, The Morning Oregonian described the rebuilt vessel as a "fine commodious little steamer." Veteran steamboat captain W.H. Whitcomb was placed in command. By Friday, May 11, Ilwaco had reached Astoria, bound for Puget Sound, where it was to be placed into service as a cannery tender.

=== Loss of tow ===
Ilwaco departed Astoria for Puget Sound on Thursday, May 10, 1900, taking with it in tow the scow-schooner Pathfinder. Off Grays Harbor, Ilwaco encountered bad weather which threatened to swamp the steamer. As a result, Ilwaco's captain ordered Pathfinder released from the tow. Ilwaco reached Port Townsend safely, but Pathfinder was left adrift. Pathfinder was reported to have been entirely new, having been built at a cost of $3,000 and launched the same week as the tow commenced.

Ilwaco had been purchased by the Port Townsend Canning Company. The company had fish traps at Waldron Island and a canning plant at Port Townsend, which in the summer of 1905 had packed 24,000 cases of sockeye salmon. On September 4, 1901, Ilwaco towed to the Port Townsend cannery the scows and boats that had been used at the Waldron Island traps during the summer.

== Return to Columbia River ==
In November 1902 it was reported that Ilwaco, then running on Puget Sound, had been purchased by Ilwaco lumber merchant George L. Colwell, for the purpose of towing log rafts from Baker Bay, on the south side of the Long Beach Peninsula to lumber mills in Portland. The Ilwaco Railway and Navigation Company was carrying an increased amount of logs, and the only existing log-towing steamer on the route, Jordan was reported to be unwilling to continue the tow work. Colwell intended to bring Ilwaco back from Puget Sound at the first indication of good weather.

On Saturday, December 13, 1902, Ilwaco departed Port Townsend, bound for the Columbia River. Arriving at the mouth of the Columbia, Ilwaco found the conditions at the river's bar to be so severe that the steamer could not enter the river. Ilwaco was forced to return to Port Townsend, arriving there on December 18, where, it was reported, the steamer would be laid up until the next spring.

On February 18, 1903, Ilwaco was reported to have arrived in Astoria from Port Angeles, having made the voyage in 24 hours.

== Transfer to San Francisco ==
On December 26, 1903, Ilwaco, under the command of Captain Leffingwell, arrived in San Francisco after a fifty-six hour trip from Astoria. The steamer's sides had been boarded up high to keep out the sea. Captain Leffingwell was reported to have been unsure what to do with Ilwaco on arrival in San Francisco.

On May 19, 1904, Ilwaco sailed from San Francisco bound for Pigeon Point, California, returning on May 27, five hours out of Pigeon Point. Ilwaco continued to make runs to and from San Francisco, Half Moon Bay, and Pigeon Point until the first part of July, 1904.

In late July 1905, the Morning Astorian reported that Ilwaco had been sold to San Francisco interests and transferred to California.

== Return to Puget Sound ==
On Thursday, July 13, 1905, Ilwaco sailed from San Francisco, under Captain Hanson, bound for Seattle. The next day, Friday, July 14, 1905, Ilwaco was in Drake's Bay, California, and reported to be in distress. The tug Sea Fox was sent to the assistance of Ilwaco, but returned to San Francisco and reported that Ilwaco was in no trouble and did not require assistance.

Ilwaco had taken shelter in Drake's Bay when it encountered heavy weather after leaving San Francisco. The life-saving crew at Point Reyes Lifeboat Station saw Ilwaco enter the bay in the fog, and concluded the steamer was in distress. They telephoned their concerns to the Merchants Exchange in San Francisco, which dispatched a tug to Drake's Bay. Ilwaco proved not to need assistance, and resumed its voyage on the morning of July 15. Ilwaco arrived at Coos Bay, Oregon on July 19, 1905.

== Operations in the San Juan Islands ==
Ilwaco arrived in Bellingham, Washington around July 26, 1905, having been purchased by Leonard D. Pike and Captain Eugene H. Simpson. Ilwaco was to be placed on the Bellingham-Blaine-Port Roberts route under the command of J. W. Tarte. Simpson was a resident of Bellingham, and Pike was a resident of East Sound, on Orcas Island.

Once repairs were complete, Ilwaco was to be placed on a route running between Bellingham and Blaine, Washington. This was expected to occur in the first part of August 1905. The Morning Astorian stated at the time that "the Ilwaco is an old-timer and should have been put in the discard years ago."

=== Collision with Sequoia ===
On October 27, 1905, at Bellingham, Ilwaco collided in foggy conditions with the lumber schooner Sequoia while Sequoia was being towed to its berth. Both captains claimed their vessels were giving fog signals. Damage to Ilwaco was reported to have not exceeded $100. Sequoia was reported to have been "badly damaged amidships." It was reported that no one was seriously hurt.

=== Bellingham-Friday Harbor route ===
On November 13, 1905, Simpson and Pike put Ilwaco on the Bellingham-Friday Harbor run, stopping at waypoints on Orcas Island. The schedule had not definitely been decided upon, but it was thought that it would include all Orcas Island points then served by the steamer Islander (built 1904, 163 g.t.), with the possible exceptions of Deer Harbor and West Sound. By leaving out these two points, it was thought more likely that Ilwaco could provide service to Lopez Island.

According to one report, Ilwaco left Friday Harbor on Monday, Wednesday, and Friday mornings at 6:00 a.m., arrived in Bellingham at about 11:30 a.m., then departed for Point Roberts and Blaine. On Tuesday, Thursday, and Saturday mornings, Ilwaco left Blaine at 6:00 a.m., arrived in Bellingham at about 11:00 a.m., and then departed at noon for points in the San Juan Islands, reaching Friday Harbor at about 6:00 p.m. On the Tuesday before November 18, 1905, Ilwaco was reported to have made the Bellingham-Friday Harbor run in five and a half hours, calling at all Orcas Island points along the route.

=== Passenger accommodation criticized ===
The Friday Harbor newspaper, San Juan Islander, described Ilwaco as "considerably faster than either of the other steamers on the Bellingham route but her passenger accommodations at present are much inferior to those of the mail boats." Perhaps in response to the newspaper comment as to the inferiority of its passenger accommodations, in early December or late November 1905, the owners of Ilwaco announced their intentions to convert the steamer, after the holidays, into an oil-burner, and also to install electric lighting.

=== Sale to salmon cannery ===
It was reported in January 1906 that Ilwaco's principal owner, Leonard D. Pike, sold the steamer to George & Barker Co., who were salmon canners in Point Roberts, for consideration paid of $6,000. Pike was also a part owner of George & Barker, and he was reported at the time to have sold his interest for $30,000.

=== Later operations ===
In July 1907, the Anacortes American reported that J.S. Woodin had secured a position as captain on Ilwaco, which was then running out of Point Roberts, Washington. As of December 1911, Ilwaco was owned by George and Barker Co., which that month placed the steamer into winter storage at Decatur Island. In 1912, Captain T. Jones of Decatur, Washington bought Ilwaco, who converted it into a fish packer powered by a gasoline engine. As a fish packing vessel, Ilwaco was reported by a non-contemporaneous source to have carried a crew of 30.

== Wrecked ==
Ilwaco was stranded in Chatham Sound, near the boundary between Alaska and British Columbia, on November 5, 1918, without loss of life. At the time there was a crew of 11 on board. Ilwaco's crew was rescued by lifeboats launched from the steamer Humboldt. The stranding is reported to have been specifically on Green Island, British Columbia.

Ilwaco was southbound from southwestern Alaska, as was Humboldt. Ilwaco had the season's catch on board. Heavy seas forced Humboldt to stand by for thirteen hours before conditions improved enough to allow Ilwaco's crew to be taken off the reef.
