= Humboldt =

Humboldt may refer to:

== People ==
- Alexander von Humboldt, German natural scientist, brother of Wilhelm von Humboldt
- Wilhelm von Humboldt, German linguist, philosopher, and diplomat, brother of Alexander von Humboldt

== Places ==
=== Argentina ===
- Humboldt, Argentina, a town in Santa Fe Province

=== Australia ===
- Humboldt, Queensland, a locality in the Central Highlands Region

=== Canada ===
- Humboldt, Saskatchewan
- Rural Municipality of Humboldt No. 370, Saskatchewan
- Humboldt (federal electoral district), a former federal electoral district
- Humboldt (provincial electoral district), a former Saskatchewan provincial electoral district

=== United States ===
- Humboldt, Illinois
- Humboldt, Iowa
- Humboldt, Kansas
- Humboldt, Minnesota
- Humboldt, Nebraska
- Humboldt, Ohio
- Humboldt, Portland, Oregon
- Humboldt, Pennsylvania
- Humboldt, South Dakota
- Humboldt, Tennessee
- Humboldt, Wisconsin, a town
  - Humboldt (community), Wisconsin, an unincorporated community within the town
- Humboldt County, California
- Humboldt County, Iowa
- Humboldt County, Nevada
- Humboldt Township (disambiguation)
- Humboldt City, Nevada, ruins of a mining settlement
- Humboldt Industrial Area, Minneapolis
- Humboldt Park, Chicago, a Chicago community area

== Geographical features ==
=== Mountains ===
- Humboldt Mountains (Antarctica), Queen Maud Land
- Humboldt Mountains (New Zealand), Otago
- Humboldt Peak (Colorado), US
- Humboldt Peak (Nevada), US
- Humboldt Range, Nevada
- Pico Humboldt, Venezuela

=== Parks, forests, nature preserves in the United States ===
- Fort Humboldt State Historic Park, Eureka, California
- Humboldt Bay National Wildlife Refuge, California
- Humboldt Redwoods State Park, California
- Humboldt Park (Chicago park), Illinois
- Humboldt Wildlife Management Area, Nevada
- Humboldt Park, now Martin Luther King, Jr. Park, Buffalo, New York
- Humboldt Parkway, Buffalo, New York, repurposed

=== Water and ice features ===
==== United States ====
- Humboldt Bay, California
- Humboldt River, Nevada
- Humboldt Salt Marsh, Nevada
- Humboldt Sink, Nevada
- Lake Humboldt, Nevada

==== Elsewhere ====
- Humboldt Current, Pacific Ocean
- Humboldt Glacier, Greenland
- Humboldt Bay, aka Yos Sudarso Bay, New Guinea
- Humboldt Falls, Fiordland, New Zealand

=== Other geographical features ===
- Sima Humboldt, Venezuela, a sinkhole

== Organizations and institutions in Germany ==
- Humboldtschule, Bad Homburg, a German Gymnasium in Bad Homburg vor der Höhe, Hesse
- Humboldt Box, a museum and information center in Berlin, Germany
- For 60 years (1949-2009), Humboldt Museum was a popular name referring to the Berlin's Natural History Museum, in Germany
- Humboldt University of Berlin (Humboldt-Universität zu Berlin)
- Maschinenbau Anstalt Humboldt, mechanical engineering firm in Cologne-Kalk 1871–1930

== Animals ==
- Vesper bat (Humboldt's big-eared brown bat) (Histiotus humboldti)
- Woolly monkey (Humboldt's woolly monkey) (Lagothrix lagotricha)
- Squirrel monkey (Humboldt's squirrel monkey) (Saimiri sciureus cassiquiarensis)
- Humboldt penguin (Spheniscus humboldti)
- Humboldt's hog-nosed skunk (Conepatus humboldtii)
- Humboldt squid (Dosidicus gigas)

== Schools in the United States ==
- California State Polytechnic University, Humboldt, California
- Humboldt High School (disambiguation), several high schools

== Ships ==
- USS Humboldt, a US Navy seaplane tender in commission from 1941 to 1947, later USCGC Humboldt, a US Coast Guard cutter in commission from 1949 to 1969
- Humboldt (steamer), an 1896 wooden steamer on the Alaska route

== In space ==
- 4877 Humboldt, an asteroid
- Humboldt (crater) on the Moon

== Transportation ==
=== Canada ===
- Humboldt Airport, Saskatchewan
- Humboldt station (Saskatchewan), a former railway station in Humboldt, Saskatchewan

=== United States ===
- Humboldt Municipal Airport (Iowa), Humboldt, Iowa
- Humboldt Municipal Airport (Tennessee), Humboldt, Tennessee
- Humboldt–Hospital station, a Buffalo Metro Rail station in Buffalo, New York
- Humboldt Street (LIRR station), a Long Island Rail Road station in Brooklyn, New York

== Other uses ==
- Humboldt Prize, for research
- Humboldt Industrial Area, Minneapolis
- Humboldt Industrial Park (Hazleton, Pennsylvania)
- Humboldt Broncos, an ice hockey team based in Humboldt, Saskatchewan, Canada
- Hotel Humboldt, in El Ávila National Park, Caracas, Venezuela
- Humboldt Fleisher, a fictional character in the novel Humboldt's Gift
- Wes Humboldt, a fictional character in the television series Corner Gas

== See also ==
- Alexander von Humboldt (disambiguation)
- Von Humboldt (disambiguation), a list of people with the surname
