= Columbia 24 Contender =

Sailboat class

Development
- Designer: Joseph McGlasson and Columbia Yachts
- Location: United States
- Year: 1963
- No. built: 330
- Builder: Columbia Yachts

Boat
- Displacement: 3,600 lb (1,633 kg)
- Draft: 3.25 ft (0.99 m)

Hull
- Type: monohull
- Construction: fiberglass
- LOA: 24.00 ft (7.32 m)
- LWL: 18.25 ft (5.56 m)
- Beam: 7.83 ft (2.39 m)
- Engine: outboard motor

Hull appendages
- Keel: modified long keel
- Ballast: 1,600 lb (726 kg)
- Rudder: keel-mounted rudder

Rig
- Rig type: Bermuda rig
- I foretriangle height: 30.10 ft (9.17 m)
- J foretriangle base: 8.80 ft (2.68 m)
- P mainsail luff: 27.00 ft (8.23 m)
- E mainsail foot: 11.50 ft (3.51 m)

Sails
- Sailplan: masthead sloop
- Mainsail area: 155.25 sq ft (14.423 m^{2})
- Jib/genoa area: 132.44 sq ft (12.304 m^{2})
- Total sail area: 287.69 sq ft (26.727 m^{2})

Racing
- PHRF: 258

The Columbia 24 Contender is an American trailerable sailboat that was designed by Joseph McGlasson in conjunction with Columbia Yachts and first built in 1963.

The design is a development of the Columbia 24, which, in turn, was a development of the Islander 24.

== Production ==
The design was built by Columbia Yachts in the United States, with 330 boats completed between 1963 and 1968, but it is now out of production.

== Design ==
The Columbia 24 Contender is a recreational keelboat, built predominantly of fiberglass, with wood trim. It has a masthead sloop rig; a spooned, raked stem; a raised counter, angled transom, a keel-mounted rudder controlled by a tiller and a fixed modified long keel, with a cutaway forefoot. It displaces 3,600 lb (1,633 kg) and carries 1,600 lb (726 kg) of lead ballast.

The boat has a draft of 3.25 ft (0.99 m) with the standard keel.

The boat is normally fitted with a small 3 to 6 hp (2 to 4 kW) outboard motor for docking and maneuvering, mounted in an aft well.

The design has sleeping accommodation for four people, with a double "V"-berth in the bow cabin and two straight settees in the main cabin. A galley was optional. The head is located in the bow cabin, under the "V"-berth. Cabin headroom is 57 in (140 cm).

The design has a PHRF racing average handicap of 258 and a hull speed of 5.7 kn (10.6 km/h).

== Operational history ==
In a 2010 review Steve Henkel wrote, "best features: Although without amenities like a stove, icebox, or stowage space, this basic boat was quite inexpensive for her time, and no doubt drew many new sailors into yachting. Worst features: Although the outboard well is located conveniently close to the cockpit, it is in an unventilated area. Some owners have had trouble with the engine smothering in its own exhaust fumes, unless the hatch is removed or sufficient ventilation is established in some other way."

== See also ==
- List of sailing boat types

Related development

- Columbia 24
- Columbia 24 Challenger
