= W29 =

W29 may refer to:

- W29 (nuclear warhead)
- Bay Bridge Airport, in Stevensville, Maryland
- Hansa-Brandenburg W.29, a 1918 German floatplane fighter
- Mercedes-Benz W29, a German grand touring car
- SS W 29, a British dredging ship
- Watkins 29, an American sailboat design
