= W25 =

W25 or W.25 may refer to:

- W25 (nuclear warhead)
- The W25, the Women's National Basketball Association's Top 25 Players of All Time
- British NVC community W25, an underscrub community in the British National Vegetation Classification system
- Compound of ten tetrahedra
- Hansa-Brandenburg W.25, a German floatplane fighter
- Mercedes-Benz W25, a racing car
- Thiin language
- Watkins 25, an American sailboat design
