= Von Humboldt =

von Humboldt may refer to:

- Alexander von Humboldt (1769–1859), Prussian naturalist and explorer
- Caroline von Humboldt (1766–1829), German salonnière and art historian
- Wilhelm von Humboldt (1767–1835), Prussian minister, linguist and philosopher
- Marie-Elisabeth von Humboldt, mother of Alexander and Willhelm

== See also ==
- Alexander von Humboldt (disambiguation)
- Humboldt (disambiguation)
