= Helsen 20 =

Sailboat class

Development
- Designer: Johannes "Jopie" Helsen
- Location: United States
- Year: 1974
- Builder: Helsen Yacht Corporation
- Role: Cruiser

Boat
- Displacement: 2,000 lb (907 kg)
- Draft: 1.17 ft (0.36 m) with swing keel up

Hull
- Type: monohull
- Construction: fiberglass
- LOA: 20.08 ft (6.12 m)
- LWL: 17.33 ft (5.28 m)
- Beam: 7.33 ft (2.23 m)
- Engine: outboard motor

Hull appendages
- Keel: swing keel
- Ballast: 400 lb (181 kg)
- Rudder: transom-mounted rudder

Rig
- Rig type: Bermuda rig

Sails
- Sailplan: masthead sloop
- Total sail area: 181.00 sq ft (16.815 m^{2})

The Helsen 20 is an American trailerable sailboat that was designed by Johannes "Jopie" Helsen as a cruiser and first built in 1974.

== Production ==
The design was built by Helsen Yachts in Saint Petersburg, Florida, United States, starting in 1974, but it is now out of production.

== Design ==
Designed as a more compact version of the Helsen 22, the Helsen 20 is a recreational keelboat, built predominantly of fiberglass, with wood trim. It has a masthead sloop rig with aluminum spars, a raked stem, a plumb transom, a transom-hung rudder controlled by a tiller and a retractable swing keel. It displaces 2,000 lb (907 kg) and carries 400 lb (181 kg) of lead ballast.

The boat has a draft of 1.17 ft (0.36 m) with the keel retracted, allowing beaching, operational in shallow water or ground transportation on a trailer.

The design has sleeping accommodation for four people, with a double "V"-berth in the bow cabin and two berths in the main cabin. The head is located in the bow cabin between the "V"-berths. A forward-hinged cabin top increases the cabin headroom from 4.25 in (11 cm) with it closed to 5.33 in (14 cm) with it open.

== See also ==
- List of sailing boat types
