= Montego 19 =

1970s US recreational keelboat

Development
- Designer: Johannes "Jopie" Helsen
- Location: United States
- Year: 1976
- Builder: Universal Marine
- Role: Cruiser

Boat
- Displacement: 1,550 lb (703 kg)
- Draft: 4.50 ft (1.37 m)

Hull
- Type: monohull
- Construction: fiberglass
- LOA: 19.50 ft (5.94 m)
- LWL: 17.75 ft (5.41 m)
- Beam: 7.17 ft (2.19 m)
- Engine: outboard motor

Hull appendages
- Keel: swing keel
- Ballast: 450 lb (204 kg)
- Rudder: transom-mounted rudder

Rig
- Rig type: Bermuda rig
- I foretriangle height: 21.00 ft (6.40 m)
- J foretriangle base: 7.40 ft (2.26 m)
- P mainsail luff: 21.00 ft (6.40 m)
- E mainsail foot: 8.50 ft (2.59 m)

Sails
- Sailplan: fractional rigged sloop
- Mainsail area: 89.25 sq ft (8.292 m^{2})
- Jib/genoa area: 77.80 sq ft (7.228 m^{2})
- Total sail area: 166.95 sq ft (15.510 m^{2})

Racing
- PHRF: 288

The Montego 19 is a recreational keelboat built by Universal Marine in St. Petersburg, Florida, United States from 1976 until 1985.

The Montego 19 was developed into the fixed keel Montego 20.

== Design ==
It is built predominantly of fiberglass, with wood trim. It has a fractional sloop rig, a raked stem, a plumb transom, a transom-hung rudder controlled by a tiller and a retractable swing keel. It displaces 1,550 lb (703 kg) and carries 450 lb (204 kg) of iron ballast.

The boat has a draft of 4.50 ft (1.37 m) with the keel extended and 1.20 ft (0.37 m) with it retracted, allowing operation in shallow water or ground transportation on a trailer.

The boat is normally fitted with a small 3 to 6 hp (2 to 4 kW) outboard motor for docking and maneuvering.

The design has sleeping accommodation for four people, with a double "V"-berth in the bow cabin and two straight settee berths in the main cabin. The galley is located on both sides, just aft of the bow cabin. The galley is equipped with a single-burner stove to port and sink to starboard. The head is located in the bow cabin, under the "V"-berth. Cabin headroom is 48 in (122 cm).

The design has a PHRF racing average handicap of 288 and a hull speed of 5.6 kn (10.4 km/h).

== Reception ==
In a January 1977 review in Cruising World, Betsy Hitz wrote, "new from Universal Marine is the trailerable Montego 19, designed by J. Jopie Helsen. The boat is described as having a 430-lb. retractable keel, and the manufacturer claims it is self-righting with keel up or down. Large, accessible hatches and generous berthing areas, characteristic of small Helsen cruisers, enable her to accommodate four: two in V-berths forward, and two in quarter berths. The 'no frills' cabin has no galley, but there is space for a portable head. There is full sitting headroom under the cabin trunk, and Helsen says, 'The forward hatch is situated to allow one to stand and pull his britches up.'..."

In a 2010 review Steve Henkel wrote, "this is a boat designed for the weekend sailor who wants to trailer-sail alone or with a companion, plus perhaps a couple of small children. She is relatively easy to sail, though her lack of controls (no vang, Cunningham, reef points, etc.) limits performance, and so limits the fun of attaining maximum speed in any wind conditions by easing this string and tightening that one ... Best features: The boat is relatively heavily built, judging by her notably higher 'bare' weight compared to comps when ballast weight is subtracted. That could make her less subject to damage, say, in a collision. Worst features: Her heavy iron keel is exposed to submerged hazards even when in the raised position. When lowered, the keel can damage its fiberglass housing, perhaps causing a serious leak, if struck a blow to the side."
