= W30 =

W30 may refer to:

- W30 (nuclear warhead)
- Mercedes-Benz 150H, a rear-engined car
- Nhuwala language
- PENTAX Optio W30, a digital camera
- Roland W-30, a music workstation
- Sony Cyber-shot DSC-W30, a digital camera
- SS W 30, an Empire ship
- Toyota MR2 (W30), a sports car
- Watkins 30, an American sailboat
- Westland 30, a British helicopter
