= Columbia 24 =

Sailboat class

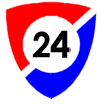

Development
- Designer: Joseph McGlasson
- Location: United States
- Year: 1962
- No. built: 1,125 (all models)
- Builder: Columbia Yachts
- Name: Columbia 24

Boat
- Displacement: 4,050 lb (1,837 kg)
- Draft: 3.33 ft (1.01 m)

Hull
- Type: Monohull
- Construction: Fiberglass
- LOA: 24.33 ft (7.42 m)
- LWL: 18.00 ft (5.49 m)
- Beam: 8.00 ft (2.44 m)
- Engine: inboard engine

Hull appendages
- Keel: fin keel
- Ballast: 1,800 lb (816 kg)
- Rudder: keel-mounted rudder

Rig
- Rig type: Bermuda rig

Sails
- Sailplan: Masthead sloop
- Total sail area: 285 sq ft (26.5 m^{2})

The Columbia 24 is a series of American sailboats that were designed by Joseph McGlasson and first built in 1962.

The Columbia 24 is a development of the Islander 24, which in turn was derived from the wooden Catalina Islander.

The Columbia 24 design was developed into the Watkins 25 in 1983, as well as many other designs.

== Development ==
Glass Laminates built the Islander 24 for designer McGlasson, who had designed it as a fiberglass version of his wooden boat design, the Catalina Islander. The Columbia 24 was created by increasing the freeboard height and adding a new deck and coach house, based upon the design of the Columbia 29. The Islander 24 moulds incorporated a wooden planking look that was from the original wooden boat imprint. The wooden planking effect was not used on the Columbia designs, however.

== Production ==
The design was built in the United States by Glass Laminates. The company was later known as Columbia Yachts. A total of 1,125 of all three models were built between 1962 and 1968.

== Design ==
The Columbia 24 series are all recreational keelboats, built predominantly of fiberglass, with wood trim. They all have masthead sloop rigs, spooned raked stems, raised transoms, keel-mounted rudders controlled by a tiller and fixed fin keels. The keel is a truncated long keel design.

The boat is fitted with an inboard engine for docking and maneuvering.

The design has a hull speed of 5.69 kn (10.54 km/h). A Columbia 24 named Tola sailed by Mike Riley completed a circumnavigation, with various crew members. He met his future wife, Karen, in Papua New Guinea, they married en route and their son, named Falcon, was born on Malta. After completing the circumnavigation they sold the Columbia 24 and bought a Dickerson 41, named Beau Soleil and completed a second circumnavigation.

W. Miller wrote, "I sailed a Contender for quite a few years. Went to the Bahamas several times. Sailed it in [Beaufort force] eight to ten in the Gulf Stream. A little wet but never a problem. Spent three weeks with my wife and kids once. Everyone thought we were crazy but today the kids (now grown) look back on it as a wonderful trip. I would have taken that little Contender anywhere. Best sailing boat I've ever had."

== Variants ==
Columbia 24
This model was introduced in 1962 and produced until 1964, with 261 built. It has a length overall of 24.33 ft (7.4 m), a waterline length of 18.00 ft (5.5 m), displaces 4,050 lb (1,837 kg) and carries 1,800 lb (816 kg) of ballast. The boat has a draft of 3.33 ft (1.01 m) with the standard keel fitted.
Columbia 24 Challenger
This raised deck model was introduced in 1962 and produced until 1968, with 534 built. It has a length overall of 24.33 ft (7.4 m), a waterline length of 18.00 ft (5.5 m), displaces 3,930 lb (1,783 kg) and carries 1,800 lb (816 kg) of ballast. The boat has a draft of 3.33 ft (1.01 m) with the standard keel fitted.
Columbia 24 Contender
This model was introduced in 1963 and produced until 1968, with 330 built. It has a length overall of 24.00 ft (7.3 m), a waterline length of 18.25 ft (5.6 m), displaces 3,600 lb (1,633 kg) and carries 1,600 lb (726 kg) of ballast. The boat has a draft of 3.25 ft (0.99 m) with the standard keel fitted.
