= Humboldt Industrial Park =

Humboldt Industrial Park may refer to:

- Humboldt Industrial Area, Minneapolis
- Humboldt Industrial Park (Hazleton, Pennsylvania)

== See also ==
- Humboldt
