= Montego 25 =

1980s US recreational keelboat

Development
- Designer: Johannes "Jopie" Helsen
- Location: United States
- Year: 1980
- No. built: 80
- Builder: Universal Marine
- Role: Racer-Cruiser
- Name: Montego 25

Boat
- Displacement: 4,550 lb (2,064 kg)
- Draft: 4.50 ft (1.37 m)

Hull
- Type: monohull
- Construction: fiberglass
- LOA: 25.25 ft (7.70 m)
- LWL: 20.50 ft (6.25 m)
- Beam: 9.08 ft (2.77 m)
- Engine: outboard motor

Hull appendages
- Keel: fin keel
- Ballast: 1,800 lb (816 kg)
- Rudder: transom-mounted rudder

Rig
- Rig type: Bermuda rig
- I foretriangle height: 32.00 ft (9.75 m)
- J foretriangle base: 11.00 ft (3.35 m)
- P mainsail luff: 27.30 ft (8.32 m)
- E mainsail foot: 9.50 ft (2.90 m)

Sails
- Sailplan: masthead sloop
- Mainsail area: 129.68 sq ft (12.048 m^{2})
- Jib/genoa area: 176.00 sq ft (16.351 m^{2})
- Total sail area: 305.68 sq ft (28.399 m^{2})

Racing
- PHRF: 216

The Montego 25 is a recreational keelboat built by Universal Marine in St. Petersburg, Florida, United States from 1980 until 1985, with 80 boats completed.

== Design ==
It is built predominantly of fiberglass, with wood trim. It has a masthead sloop rig, a raked stem, a plumb transom, a transom-hung rudder controlled by a tiller and a fin keel or optional shoal draft keel. It displaces 4,500 lb (2,041 kg) and carries 1,800 lb (816 kg) of iron ballast.

The boat has a draft of 4.50 ft (1.37 m) with the standard keel and 3.50 ft (1.07 m) with the optional shoal draft keel.

The boat is normally fitted with a small 4 to 10 hp (3 to 7 kW) outboard motor for docking and maneuvering, although a Japanese Yanmar 1GM inboard diesel engine was a factory option.

The design has sleeping accommodation for four people, with a double "V"-berth in the bow cabin and two straight settee berths in the main cabin. The galley is located on both sides, at the companionway. The galley is equipped with a two-burner stove to port and sink and icebox to starboard. The head is located just aft of the bow cabin. Cabin headroom is 71 in (180 cm).

The design has a PHRF racing average handicap of 216 and a hull speed of 6.1 kn (11.3 km/h).

== Reception ==
In a 2010 review Steve Henkel wrote, "designer Jopie Helsen owned a marina in St. Petersburg, FL, and designed boats on the side. This one may have been his best effort. She has a high Motion Index, good space down below, is relatively easy to singlehand, and properly sailed will give good performance on the race course. Best features: We used to race against a Montego 25 in our Morgan 24/25 ... and although we won the season trophy once or twice based on the average of our scores, we were never able to beat the Montego, either boat for boat or on corrected time. She is fast, we observed, both light and heavy air, And despite having the most headroom among her comps, she manages to avoid having a top-heavy look on the water. A wide companionway hatch and opening ports keep her cabin light and airy. She was available with either a shoal (3' 6") draft or deep fin (4' 6"). Sailing performance is distinctly better with the deep keel option. Worst features: No significant faults observed."
