= Watkins 23 =

1970s American recreational keelboat

Development
- Designer: Johannes "Jopie" Helsen
- Location: United States
- Year: 1973
- No. built: 400
- Builder: Watkins Yachts
- Name: Watkins 23

Boat
- Displacement: 2,500 lb (1,134 kg)
- Draft: 6.00 ft (1.83 m), centerboard down

Hull
- Type: Monohull
- Construction: Fiberglass
- LOA: 23.00 ft (7.01 m)
- LWL: 19.80 ft (6.04 m)
- Beam: 8.00 ft (2.44 m)
- Engine: Outboard motor

Hull appendages
- Keel: stub keel and centerboard
- Ballast: 900 lb (408 kg)
- Rudder: transom-mounted rudder

Rig
- Rig type: Bermuda rig
- I foretriangle height: 24.00 ft (7.32 m)
- J foretriangle base: 9.00 ft (2.74 m)
- P mainsail luff: 21.00 ft (6.40 m)
- E mainsail foot: 8.75 ft (2.67 m)

Sails
- Sailplan: Masthead sloop
- Mainsail area: 91.88 sq ft (8.536 m^{2})
- Jib/genoa area: 108.00 sq ft (10.034 m^{2})
- Total sail area: 199.88 sq ft (18.569 m^{2})

Racing
- PHRF: 276

The Watkins 23 is a recreational keelboat built by Watkins Yachts in the United States. The base model was introduced in 1973. An mproved version with a full fiberglass interior and headliner, the XL, was introduced in 1977. It went out of production in 1980, with 400 completed.

Designed by Johannes "Jopie" Helsen, modified by Watkins Yachts, it is an authorized development of the Helson 22.

The fiberglass hull has a spooned raked stem, a near-vertical transom, a transom-hung rudder controlled by a tiller and a fixed stub keel with a centerboard. The boat has a draft of 6.00 ft (1.83 m) with the centerboard extended and 1.50 ft (0.46 m) with it retracted. Hull speed is 5.9 kn (10.9 km/h).

It has a masthead sloop rig.

The design has sleeping accommodation for five people, with a double "V"-berth in the bow cabin, a drop-down dinette table that forms a double berth in the main cabin and an aft quarter berth on the port side. The galley is located on the port side just aft of the bow cabin. The galley is equipped with a two-burner stove and a sink. The head is located in the bow cabin, under the "V"-berth on the starboard side. Cabin headroom is 58 in (147 cm).

In a 2010 review Steve Henkel wrote of the 23XL model, "best features: You get basic sailing transportation for very little money. Worst features: Construction is mediocre, with equipment such as a galvanized boat trailer winch (which can quickly rust in salt water) mounted in the cabin to hoist the centerboard."
