= Islander 24 Bahama =

Sailboat class

Development
- Designer: Joseph McGlasson
- Location: United States
- Year: 1964
- No. built: 500
- Builder: McGlasson Marine/Islander Yachts
- Name: Islander 24 Bahama

Boat
- Displacement: 4,200 lb (1,905 kg)
- Draft: 3.42 ft (1.04 m)

Hull
- Type: Monohull
- Construction: Fiberglass
- LOA: 24.00 ft (7.32 m)
- LWL: 20.00 ft (6.10 m)
- Beam: 7.83 ft (2.39 m)

Hull appendages
- Keel: fin keel
- Ballast: 1,700 lb (771 kg)
- Rudder: keel-mounted rudder

Rig
- Rig type: Bermuda rig
- I foretriangle height: 28.84 ft (8.79 m)
- J foretriangle base: 8.42 ft (2.57 m)
- P mainsail luff: 25.80 ft (7.86 m)
- E mainsail foot: 11.58 ft (3.53 m)

Sails
- Sailplan: Masthead sloop
- Mainsail area: 149.38 sq ft (13.878 m^{2})
- Jib/genoa area: 121.42 sq ft (11.280 m^{2})
- Total sail area: 270.80 sq ft (25.158 m^{2})

Racing
- PHRF: 264

The Islander 24 Bahama, also called the Islander Bahama 24, is an American trailerable sailboat that was designed by Joseph McGlasson and first built in 1964.

The Islander 24 Bahama is a development of the 1961 Islander 24 which itself is a fiberglass development of the wooden-hulled Catalina Islander.

== Development ==
McGlasson approached Glas Laminates to build a version of his wooden Catalina Islander in fiberglass. The mold was created by using the hull of one of the wooden boats and the resulting fiberglass boats retained the distinctive wooden board imprints from the mold. The 1961 Islander 24 features a trunk cabin, but the raised deck Islander 24 Bahama version proved a bigger commercial success and, as a result the Islander 24 had a relatively short production run.

== Production ==
The design was built by McGlasson Marine/Islander Yachts in the United States from 1964 to 1970, with 500 boats completed, but it is now out of production.

== Design ==
The Islander 24 Bahama is a recreational keelboat, built predominantly of fiberglass, with wood trim. It has a masthead sloop rig, a spooned raked stem, a raised transom, a keel-mounted rudder controlled by a tiller and a fixed fin keel. It displaces 4,200 lb (1,905 kg) and carries 1,700 lb (771 kg) of lead ballast. It has a raised deck which gives a cabin with greater shoulder room, rather than a trunk cabin.

The boat has a draft of 3.42 ft (1.04 m) with the standard keel fitted.

The boat is normally fitted with a small 3 to 6 hp (2 to 4 kW) outboard motor for docking and maneuvering.

The design has sleeping accommodation for four people, with a double "V"-berth in the bow cabin and two straight settees in the main cabin. A galley was optional. The head is located in the bow cabin, under the "V"-berth. Cabin headroom is 54 in (140 cm).

The design has a PHRF racing average handicap of 264 and a hull speed of 6.0 kn (11.1 km/h).

== See also ==
- Islander 24
