= Columbia 24 Challenger =

Sailboat class

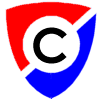

Development
- Designer: Joseph McGlasson
- Location: United States
- Year: 1962
- No. built: 534
- Builder: Columbia Yachts
- Name: Columbia 24 Challenger

Boat
- Displacement: 3,930 lb (1,783 kg)
- Draft: 3.33 ft (1.01 m)

Hull
- Type: monohull
- Construction: fiberglass
- LOA: 24.33 ft (7.42 m)
- LWL: 18.00 ft (5.49 m)
- Beam: 8.00 ft (2.44 m)
- Engine: outboard motor

Hull appendages
- Keel: modified long keel
- Ballast: 1,800 lb (816 kg)
- Rudder: keel-mounted rudder

Rig
- Rig type: Bermuda rig
- I foretriangle height: 30.10 ft (9.17 m)
- J foretriangle base: 9.00 ft (2.74 m)
- P mainsail luff: 27.00 ft (8.23 m)
- E mainsail foot: 11.30 ft (3.44 m)

Sails
- Sailplan: masthead sloop
- Mainsail area: 152.55 sq ft (14.172 m^{2})
- Jib/genoa area: 135.45 sq ft (12.584 m^{2})
- Total sail area: 288.00 sq ft (26.756 m^{2})

Racing
- PHRF: 258

The Columbia 24 Challenger, or Columbia Challenger 24, is an American trailerable sailboat that was designed by Joseph McGlasson and first built in 1962.

The design is a raised-deck development of the Columbia 24, which, in turn, was a development of the Islander 24.

== Production ==
The design was built by Columbia Yachts in the United States between 1962 and 1968, with 534 boats completed, but it is now out of production.

== Design ==
The Columbia 24 Challenger was intended as a raised-deck, economy model for the Columbia line and sold at a lower price than the Columbia 24, due to lower production costs.

The Columbia 24 Challenger is a recreational keelboat, built predominantly of fiberglass, with wood trim. It has a masthead sloop rig; a spooned raked stem; a raised counter, angled transom; a keel-hung rudder controlled by a tiller and a fixed modified long keel, with a cut-away forefoot. It displaces 3,930 lb (1,783 kg) and carries 1,800 lb (816 kg) of lead ballast.

The boat has a draft of 3.33 ft (1.01 m) with the standard keel.

The boat is normally fitted with a small 3 to 6 hp (2 to 4 kW) outboard motor for docking and maneuvering.

The design has sleeping accommodation for four people, with a double "V"-berth in the bow cabin and two straight settees in the main cabin. A galley was optional. The head is located in the bow cabin, under the "V"-berth. Cabin headroom is 48 in (120 cm).

The design has a PHRF racing average handicap of 258 and a hull speed of 5.7 kn (10.6 km/h).

== Operational history ==
In a 2010 review Steve Henkel wrote, "the Challenger was Columbia's 'economy model,' with essentially the same hull and sail plan as the Columbia Contender 24 ... but instead of a trunk cabin with doghouse, the Challenger has a raised deck. Back in 1963, she was $1,000 less expensive than the doghouse version 'due to substantial savings in production cost,' according to an ad of the time ... Best features: When she was first introduced, this economical and relatively roomy 24-footer would be hard to beat for value. Worst features: The 4-berth layout is similar to the Contender 24, but simplified, with cooking gear optional. Some sailors might prefer the extra amenities available in the doghouse model (and in many other boats)."

== See also ==
- List of sailing boat types
