= Watkins 17 =

Sailboat class

Development
- Designer: Watkins brothers
- Location: United States
- Year: 1975
- No. built: more than 100
- Builder: Watkins Yachts
- Name: Watkins 17

Boat
- Displacement: 580 lb (263 kg)
- Draft: 3.50 ft (1.07 m) centerboard down

Hull
- Type: Monohull
- Construction: Fiberglass
- LOA: 17.00 ft (5.18 m)
- LWL: 15.83 ft (4.82 m)
- Beam: 6.42 ft (1.96 m)

Hull appendages
- Keel: centerboard
- Ballast: 90 lb (41 kg)
- Rudder: transom-mounted rudder

Rig
- Rig type: Bermuda rig

Sails
- Sailplan: Fractional rigged sloop
- Total sail area: 145 sq ft (13.5 m^{2})

The Watkins 17, also referred to as the W17, is recreational keelboat built by Watkins Yachts in Clearwater, Florida, United States from 1975 to 1981, with over 100 examples completed. Most were sold to a Florida sailing club for use as one design racers.

Production was curtailed in 1979, when the company was sold, with few boats built in 1979-1981. The design's moulds were eventually abandoned behind the old plant building when the company was wound up in 1989. The building was sold to an electrical contractor and the moulds are presumed to have been destroyed.

Designed by the Watkins brothers, the hull is built predominantly of hand-laid 24 oz rove fiberglass. The deck is a single piece of moulded fibreglass and the cockpit is self-bailing. It has a spooned plumb stem, a vertical transom, a transom-hung rudder made from Philippine mahogany controlled by tiller and a centerboard keel. The lead ballast is encapsulated in fibreglass. It has a hull speed of 5.33 kn (9.87 km/h). The boat has a draft of 3.50 ft (1.07 m) with the centreboard extended and 0.58 ft (0.18 m) with it retracted. A hot-dipped galvanized trailer was included with the boat.

It has a small cuddy cabin.

It has a fractional sloop rig with aluminum spars made by Kenyan, with 145 sq ft (13.5 m^{2}) of sail area.
