= Statue of Alexander von Humboldt (Tiergarten, Berlin) =

Statue in Berlin, Germany

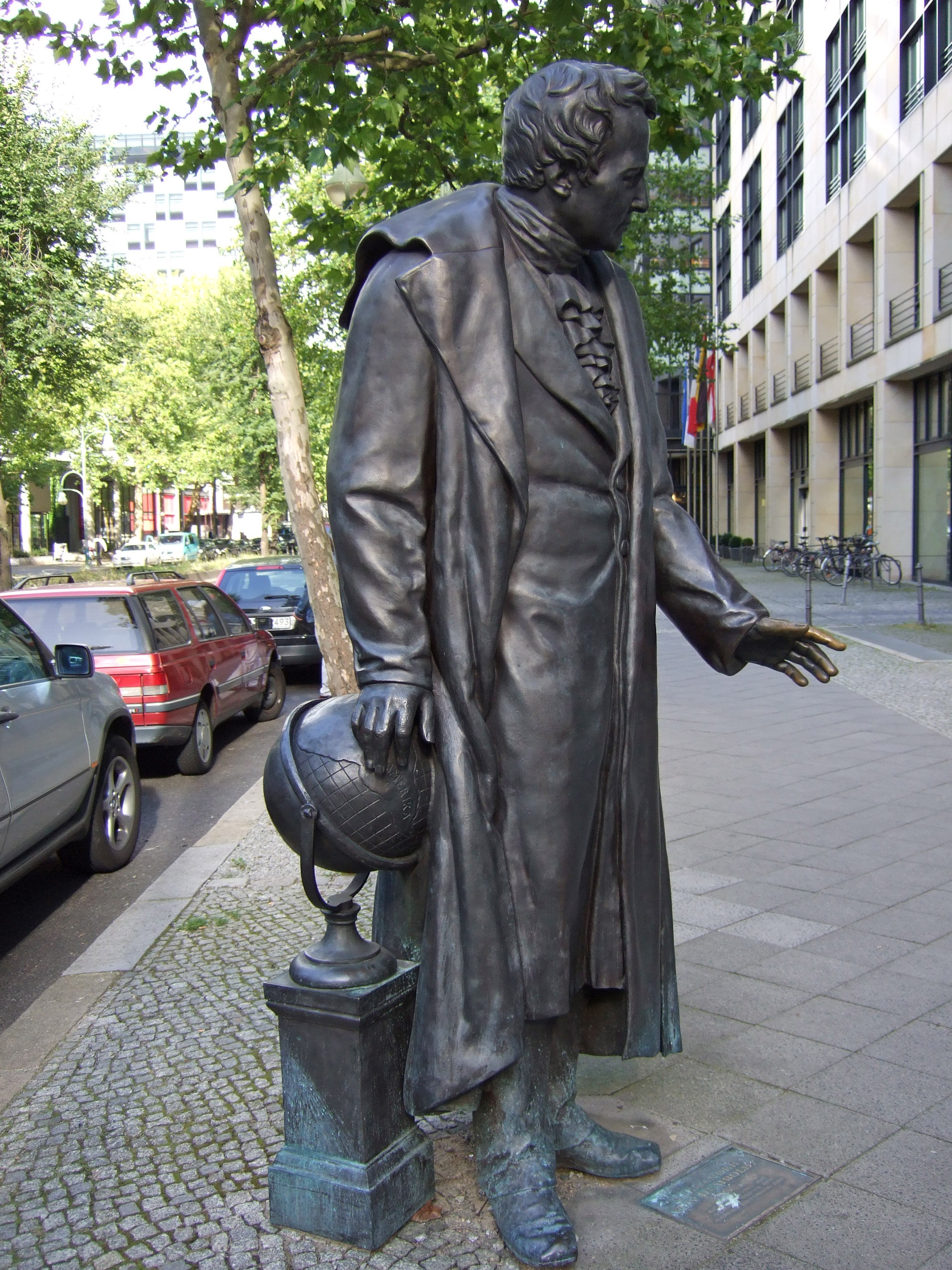
- The statue in 2007
- Artist: Gustav Bläser, André Jeschar
- Subject: Alexander von Humboldt
- Location: Berlin, Germany; 52°30′22″N 13°20′35″E

The Alexander von Humboldt statue in Tiergarten, Berlin, Germany, was unveiled on 31 August 1999. It is a larger-than-life bronze statue of the scientist, explorer, and naturalist Alexander von Humboldt, who stands with his right hand resting on a globe, on top of South America. It is in front of the entrance to the German Institute for Standardization (DIN), located in the Alexander-von-Humboldt-Haus building at 31 Budapester Straße.

The sculpture is credited to two artists: Gustav Bläser, who created the original large-format half-relief in 1878, and André Jeschar, who used it as a model for his work. Standing 2.7 metres (8.9 ft) in height, it is a replica of the Humboldt statue in Cologne.

== See also ==
- Alexander von Humboldt Memorial, Berlin
