= Alexander von Humboldt II =

Ship built in 2011

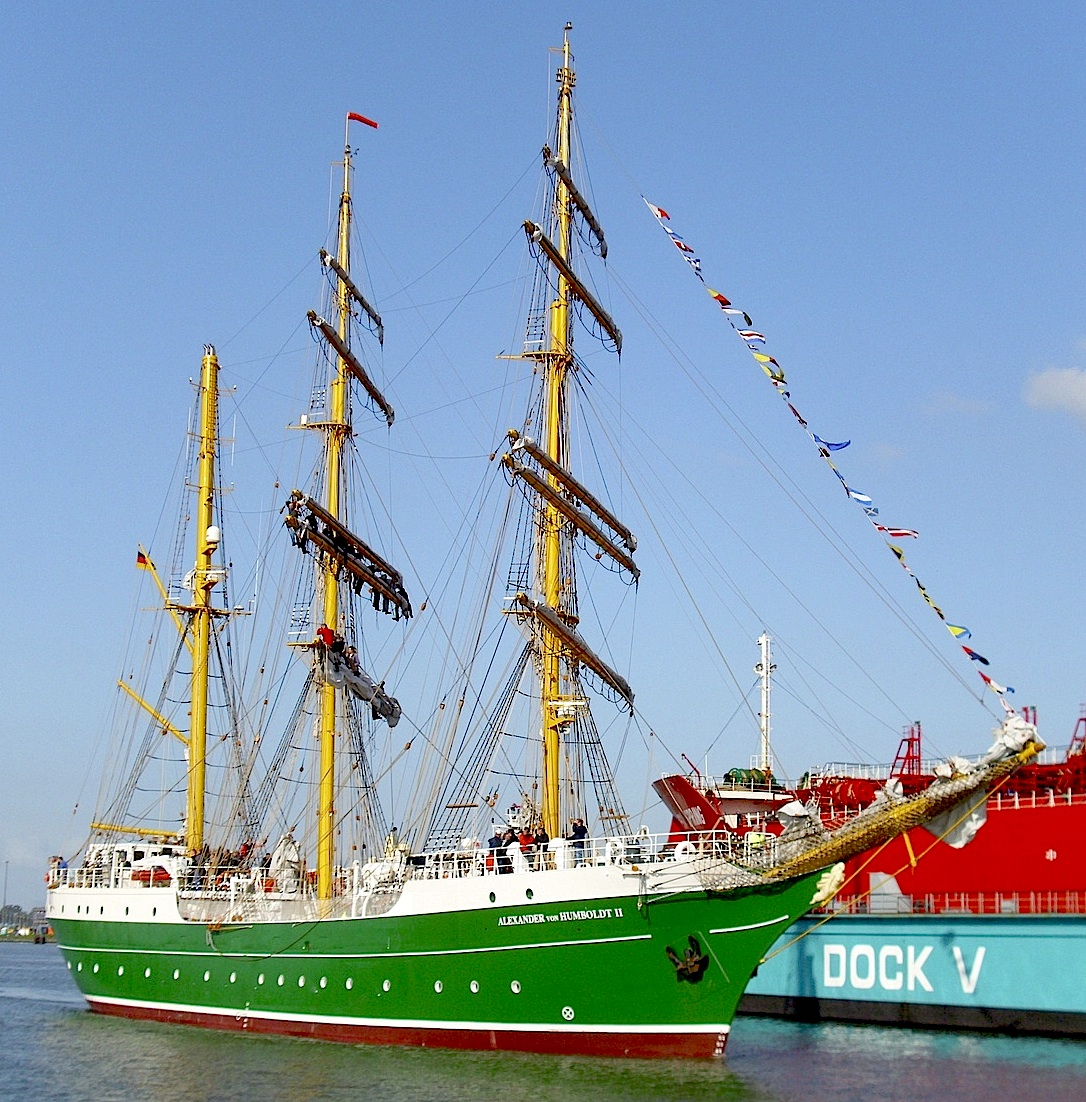
- Alexander von Humboldt II

History

Germany
- Name: Alexander von Humboldt II
- Namesake: Alexander von Humboldt
- Owner: Deutsche Stiftung Sail Training, Bremerhaven [German Sail Training Foundation, Bremerhaven]
- Builder: Brenn- und Verformtechnik (BVT), Bremen
- Yard number: 04
- Laid down: 11 December 2008
- Launched: 25 May 2011
- Christened: 24 September 2011
- Home port: Bremerhaven
- Identification: IMO number: 9618446; Call sign: DDKK2; MMSI number: 218768000
- Nickname(s): Alex

General characteristics
- Type: three-masted steel barque
- Tonnage: 763 GT/228 NT
- Displacement: 992 tons
- Length: 65 m (213 ft)
- Beam: 10 m (33 ft)
- Draft: 4.7 m (15 ft)
- Installed power: 749 hp (559 kW)
- Propulsion: Sail; auxiliary Diesel engine
- Sail plan: 24 sails; 1,360 m^{2} (14,600 sq ft) sail area
- Complement: 79

Alexander von Humboldt II is a German sailing ship built as a replacement for the ship Alexander von Humboldt, which had been launched in 1906 and used for sail training since 1988. Constructed by Brenn- und Verformtechnik (BVT) in Bremen, the new ship was launched in 2011.

Just like her predecessor, the Alexander von Humboldt II is operated by Deutsche Stiftung Sail Training in Bremerhaven which offers sail training for people between 14 and 75 years of age.

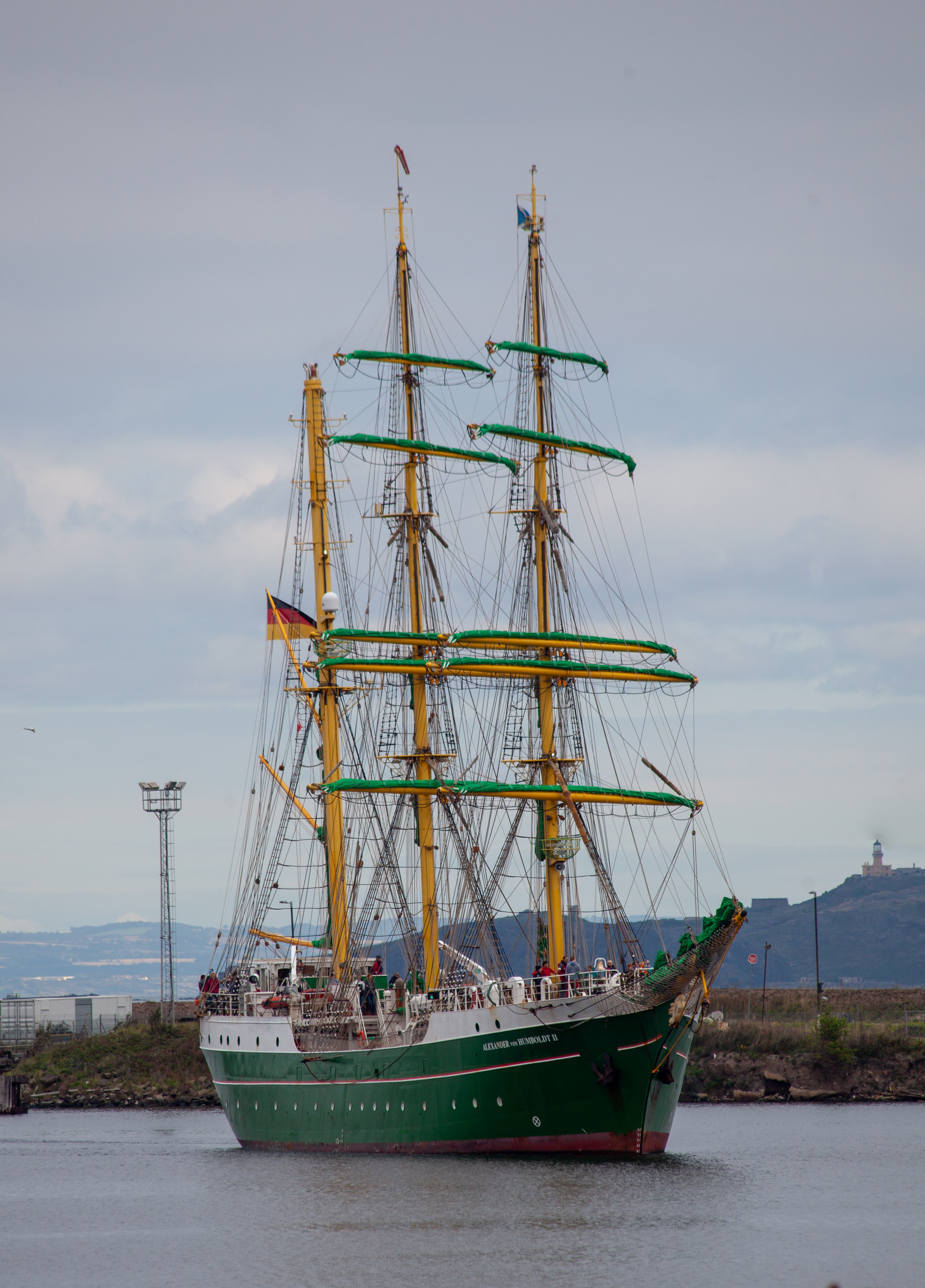
Alexander von Humboldt II at Leith, 2018

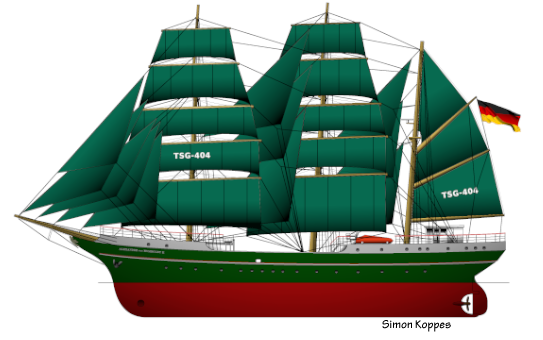
Lineart Alexander von Humboldt II

== See also ==
- Alexander von Humboldt
- Alexander von Humboldt (ship)
- List of large sailing vessels
