= List of schools named after Alexander von Humboldt =

Alexander-von-Humboldt-Schule or Alexander-von-Humboldt-Gymnasium is the name of the following schools, named after Alexander von Humboldt:

== Germany ==
- Alexander-von-Humboldt-Schule Aßlar (Gesamtschule)
- Alexander-von-Humboldt-Realschule Bayreuth
- Alexander-von-Humboldt-Gymnasium Berlin
- Alexander-von-Humboldt-Gymnasium Bornheim
- Alexander-von-Humboldt-Gymnasium Bremen
- Alexander-von-Humboldt-Gymnasium Chemnitz
- Gymnasium Alexander von Humboldt Eberswalde
- Alexander-von-Humboldt Schule Eschwege (Grundschule)
- Alexander-von-Humboldt-Schule Gießen (Haupt- und Realschule)
- Alexander-von-Humboldt-Schule Goldkronach (Grundschule)
- Alexander-von-Humboldt-Gymnasium Greifswald
- Alexander-von-Humboldt-Gymnasium (Hamburg)
- Alexander-von-Humboldt-Gymnasium, Konstanz, Baden-Württemberg
- Humboldt-Gymnasium, Köln
- Alexander-von-Humboldt-Schule Lauterbach (Gymnasium)
- Humboldt-Gymnasium Leipzig (nur nach Alexander von Humboldt benannt)
- Alexander-von-Humboldt-Mittelschule Marktredwitz
- Alexander-von-Humboldt-Schule Neumünster (Gymnasium)
- Alexander-von-Humboldt-Gymnasium, Neuss, North Rhine-Westphalia
- Humboldt-Gymnasium, Potsdam, Brandenburg
- Alexander-von-Humboldt-Schule Rüsselsheim (Gesamtschule)
- Alexander-von-Humboldt-Gymnasium, Schweinfurt, Bavaria
- Alexander-von-Humboldt-Schule Viernheim (Gymnasium)
- Gymnasium Alexander von Humboldt Werdau
- Alexander-von-Humboldt-Schule Wittmund

== Elsewhere ==
- Alexander von Humboldt German International School Montreal, Canada
- Instituto Alexander Von Humboldt, Barranquilla, Colombia
- Colegio Alemán Alexander von Humboldt (Mexico City), Mexico
- Deutsche Schule Lima Alexander von Humboldt, Peru
- Colegio Humboldt, Caracas, Venezuela
