= Helsen 22 =

Sailboat class

Development
- Designer: Johannes "Jopie" Helsen
- Location: United States
- Year: 1971
- Builder: Helsen Yacht Corporation
- Role: Cruiser

Boat
- Displacement: 2,200 lb (998 kg)
- Draft: 4.50 ft (1.37 m) with swing keel down

Hull
- Type: monohull
- Construction: fiberglass
- LOA: 22.00 ft (6.71 m)
- LWL: 19.00 ft (5.79 m)
- Beam: 8.00 ft (2.44 m)
- Engine: outboard motor

Hull appendages
- Keel: swing keel
- Ballast: 700 lb (318 kg)
- Rudder: transom-mounted rudder

Rig
- Rig type: Bermuda rig
- I foretriangle height: 24.00 ft (7.32 m)
- J foretriangle base: 9.50 ft (2.90 m)
- P mainsail luff: 20.00 ft (6.10 m)
- E mainsail foot: 8.80 ft (2.68 m)

Sails
- Sailplan: masthead sloop
- Mainsail area: 88.00 sq ft (8.175 m^{2})
- Jib/genoa area: 114.00 sq ft (10.591 m^{2})
- Total sail area: 202.00 sq ft (18.766 m^{2})

The Helsen 22 is an American trailerable sailboat that was designed by Johannes "Jopie" Helsen as a cruiser and first built in 1971.

The design was later developed into the Watkins 23. The Apollo 21 sailboat was also built from the same tooling.

== Production ==
The boat was the first design built by Helsen Yachts in Saint Petersburg, Florida, United States, starting in 1971, but it is now out of production.

== Design ==
The Helsen 22 is a recreational keelboat, built predominantly of fiberglass, with wood trim. It has a masthead sloop rig with aluminum spars; a raked stem; a plumb transom; a transom-hung, kick-up rudder controlled by a tiller and a retractable swing keel. It displaces 2,200 lb (998 kg) and carries 700 lb (318 kg) of lead ballast. The boat has foam flotation and is unsinkable. It will self-right with the keel extended or retracted.

The boat has a draft of 4.50 ft (1.37 m) with the keel extended and 1.16 ft (0.35 m) with it retracted, allowing beaching or ground transportation on a trailer.

The design has sleeping accommodation for five people, with a double "V"-berth in the bow cabin, a drop-down dinette table that converts to a double berth in the main cabin and an aft quarter berth on the port side, under the cockpit. The galley is located on the port side admidships. The galley is equipped with a two-burner stove and a sink. The head is located in the bow cabin on the starboard side. A pop-top increases the cabin headroom from 4.50 in (11 cm) with it closed to 5.83 in (15 cm) with it open.

For sailing the design is equipped with jib roller reefing as standard equipment.

== See also ==
- List of sailing boat types
