= Islander (database) =

Content
- Description: integrative islands in prokaryotic genomes
- Organisms: Prokaryotes

Contact
- Research center: Indiana University
- Primary citation: PMID 14681358

Access
- Website: http://www.indiana.edu/~islander

Islander is a database of integrative islands in prokaryotic genomes.

== See also ==
- Mobile genetic elements
