= Alexander von Humboldt National Forest =

National forest of Peru

- Bosque Nacional Alexander Von Humboldt
- Interactive map of Alexander von Humboldt National Forest
- Location: Peru
- Nearest city: Pucallpa
- Coordinates: 8.380°S 74.464°W
- Area: 470,000 ha (1,800 sq mi)
- Established: 1965

The Alexander von Humboldt National Forest is a national forest of Peru. It is in the Amazon rainforest, 685 km (426 mi) by road from Lima, Peru. It is one of the largest and most important forests in the Amazon.

The forest was established in 1965 for production forestry. In the 1970s, surveys and studies were performed. However, the forest has been threatened by illegal logging and subsistence farming.

This zone Alexander von Humboldt published by means of R.M is shaped by the National Forest. Nº 0574-99-AG, corresponding to the department of Ucayali and Areas Authorized for the Use of Incidental Teams to the motosierra named "Castle" or "Chullachaqui" created with R.M. Nº 0654-2000-AG.
