= Gateway Hotel =

Hotel in Port Moresby, Papua New Guinea

- Location within Papua New Guinea

General information
- Location: Port Moresby, Papua New Guinea
- Coordinates: 9°26′50″S 147°12′48″E

Gateway Hotel is a hotel in Port Moresby, Papua New Guinea. It is an important conference centre and has hosted some notable political figures and other distinguished guests over the years and has been cited as "one of the best places to meet the Papua New Guinean Members of Parliament". It formerly housed the offices of the World Bank in Papua New Guinea.
