= Alexander von Humboldt (ship) =

German sailing barque built in 1906

Coordinates: 54°30′N 10°18′E

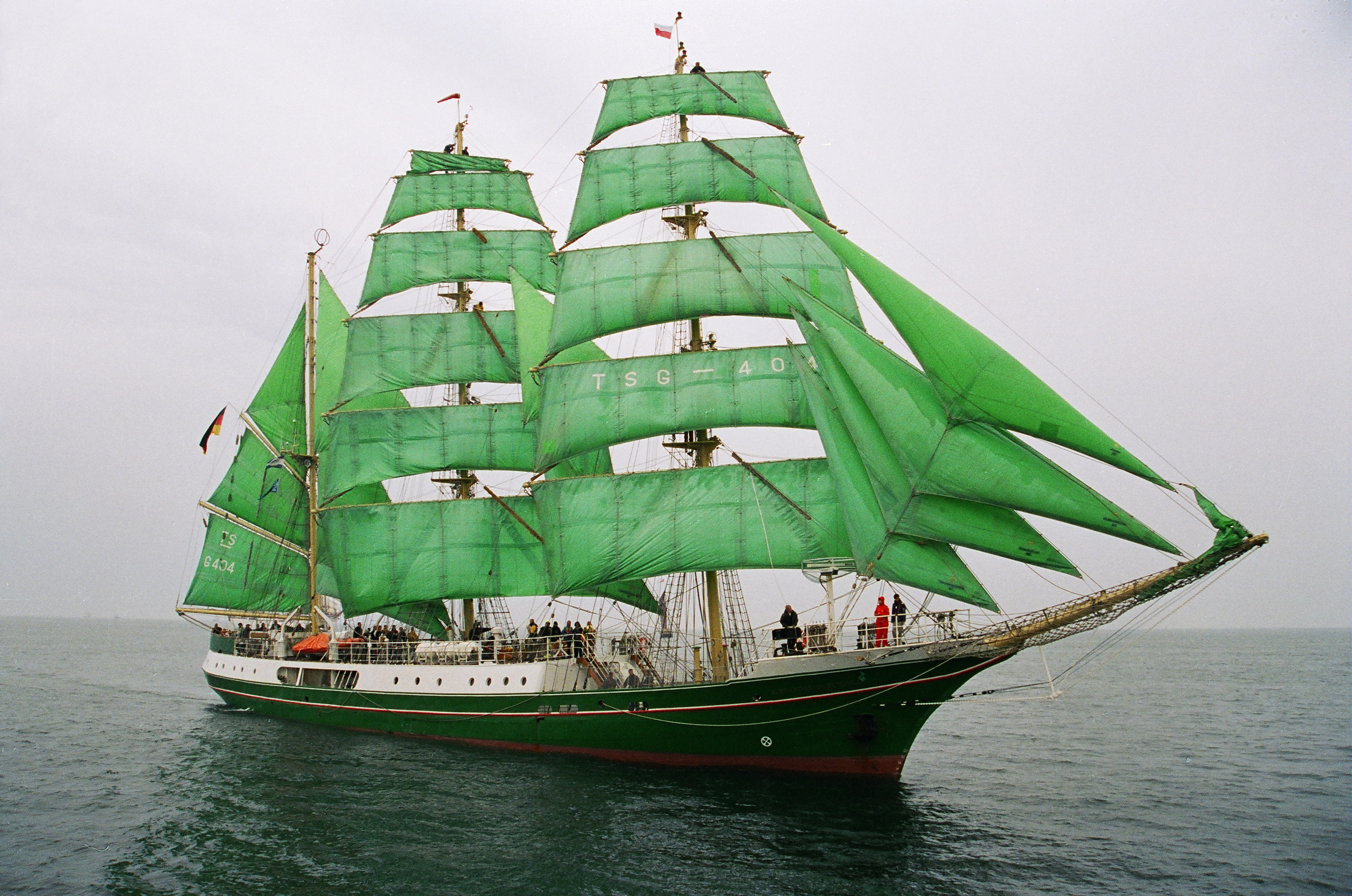
- Alexander von Humboldt – all 25 sails set

History

West Germany
- Name: Reserve Sonderburg
- Ordered: 1906
- Builder: AG Weser, Bremen, Germany
- Yard number: 155
- Launched: 10 September 1906
- Out of service: 1985
- Fate: Sold

Germany
- Name: Alexander von Humboldt
- Namesake: Alexander von Humboldt
- Owner: Deutsche Stiftung Sail Training
- Christened: 20 May 1988
- Acquired: 1985
- Home port: Bremerhaven
- Identification: IMO number: 8626886; Call sign: DFAW; MMSI number: 211227250
- Fate: Sold

Bahamas
- Name: Alexander von Humboldt
- Acquired: December 2011
- In service: February 2012
- Home port: Freeport
- Identification: IMO number: 8626886; MMSI number: 211227250

Antigua and Barbuda
- Name: Alexander von Humboldt
- In service: early 2013
- Home port: St. John’s
- Identification: IMO number: 8626886; Call sign: V2YK6; MMSI number: 211227250

Germany
- Name: Alexander von Humboldt
- In service: 2013
- Home port: Bremerhaven
- Identification: IMO number: 8626886; Call sign: DHVH2; MMSI number: 211227250
- Status: docked

General characteristics
- Displacement: 396 metric tons
- Length: 62.55 m (205.2 ft)
- Beam: 8.02 m (26.3 ft)
- Draft: 4.8 m (16 ft)
- Installed power: 375 kW
- Propulsion: sail; auxiliary MAN Diesel engine
- Sail plan: 25 sails; 1,036 m^{2} (11,150 sq ft) sail area
- Complement: 60 (25 crew + 35 trainees)

Alexander von Humboldt is a German sailing ship originally built in 1906 by the German shipyard AG Weser at Bremen as the lightship Reserve Sonderburg. She was operated throughout the North and Baltic Seas until being retired in 1986. Subsequently, she was converted into a three masted barque by the German shipyard Motorwerke Bremerhaven and was re-launched in 1988 as Alexander von Humboldt. In 2011 the ship was taken off sail-training and sent to the Caribbean for the charter business, then she was converted to a botel.

== History ==
Planned and ordered in 1906 as a reserve lightvessel (to stand in for other lightvessels during scheduled yard maintenance), the ship was launched on 10 September 1906 at AG Weser with the yard number 155 as the first of its class. Its hull was that of a sailing ship, as was common in this class, with the beacon mast in place of the main mast. There is no clear record whether she was christened Reserve Fehmarnbelt (after her first station) or Reserve Sonderburg, as both names are documented. On the ship's bell appears only Reserve; a first home port at Sonderburg (today Sønderborg, Denmark) is most likely. From 1920 to 1945 the ship was home ported at Kiel-Holtenau and served in many locations, but mainly along Baltic shores.

She was installed in 1945 as a permanent replacement for the bombed and damaged light vessel Kiel. In the spring of 1957 she was rammed by a Swedish freighter and sank; she was raised and after a two-year overhaul returned to service in 1959.

During the summer of 1967 her location was upgraded to a lighthouse and she returned to stand-by reserve for North Sea deployment. Eventually she was assigned as permanent replacement for the retired Amrumbank. Being supplanted again by a fully automated light vessel – and following another collision and overhaul in Wilhelmshaven – she was towed to Bremerhaven and named Confidentia.

== Alexander von Humboldt ==
A newly established foundation, the Deutsche Stiftung Sail Training or DSST (German Sail Training Foundation), bought the vessel and transformed it into a tall ship according to the plans of Polish naval architect Zygmunt Choreń. On 30 May 1988 she was christened Alexander von Humboldt after the celebrated German explorer. In a historical reference to the sailing ships of the Rickmers shipping company of Bremerhaven, her hull was painted green. Green sails were installed as a marketing tool for advertising campaigns by the ship's sponsor and founding member of DSST, the German brewery Beck's.

"Alex", as she was called by her crew, served as a sail training ship and was the flagship of DSST. She traveled over 300,000 nautical miles (560,000 km) in 20 years (equal to 14 times around the equator). High points every year were tall ships' races and winter cruises to the Canary Islands in the North Atlantic Ocean. During summer months she sailed in the North and Baltic Seas.

Her longest cruise was a voyage in commemoration of Alexander von Humboldt's expedition to South America and the Caribbean. On 18 January 2006, Alex rounded Cape Horn under sail, following the route of the legendary tall ships of the 19th and early 20th century in celebration of her centenary year.

In October 2011 she was taken out of service for DSST and replaced by the newly built Alexander von Humboldt II. She was sold and relocated to the Bahamas in early 2012. In early 2013 she was sailed back to Europe, as the anticipated cruise business in the Caribbean did not materialize; as of November 2013 the hull has been repaired and repainted, but bowthruster and main propeller have been permanently removed.

In 2014, she was converted into a small hotel (42 bunk beds in 16 cabins) and restaurant. Since 19 April 2015, she was located in the Europahafen Bremen, with plans to move her to the Schlachte in 2016. The move took place on October 24 of that year, with the masts and rigging removed to make the ship fit underneath the three bridges she had to pass to reach her final destination.

== See also ==
- Alexander von Humboldt (explorer)
- Alexander von Humboldt II
- List of large sailing vessels
