= Montego 20 =

1970s US recreational keelboat

Development
- Designer: Johannes "Jopie" Helsen
- Location: United States
- Year: 1976
- Builder: Universal Marine
- Role: Cruiser
- Name: Montego 20

Boat
- Displacement: 1,700 lb (771 kg)
- Draft: 2.00 ft (0.61 m)

Hull
- Type: monohull
- Construction: fiberglass
- LOA: 19.50 ft (5.94 m)
- LWL: 17.75 ft (5.41 m)
- Beam: 7.17 ft (2.19 m)
- Engine: outboard motor

Hull appendages
- Keel: fin keel
- Ballast: 600 lb (272 kg)
- Rudder: transom-mounted rudder

Rig
- Rig type: Bermuda rig
- I foretriangle height: 21.00 ft (6.40 m)
- J foretriangle base: 7.30 ft (2.23 m)
- P mainsail luff: 21.00 ft (6.40 m)
- E mainsail foot: 8.50 ft (2.59 m)

Sails
- Sailplan: fractional rigged sloop
- Mainsail area: 89.25 sq ft (8.292 m^{2})
- Jib/genoa area: 76.65 sq ft (7.121 m^{2})
- Total sail area: 165.95 sq ft (15.417 m^{2})

Racing
- PHRF: 282

The Montego 20 is a recreational keelboat built by Universal Marine in St. Petersburg, Florida, United States from 1976 until 1985.

== Design ==
It is built predominantly of fiberglass, with wood trim. It has a fractional sloop rig with a deck-stepped mast, a raked stem, a plumb transom, a transom-hung rudder controlled by a tiller and a shoal draft keel. It displaces 1,700 lb (771 kg) and carries 600 lb (272 kg) of ballast.

The boat has a draft of 2.00 ft (0.61 m) with the standard shoal-draft keel, allowing operation in shallow water or ground transportation on a trailer.

The boat is normally fitted with a small 3 to 6 hp (2 to 4 kW) outboard motor for docking and maneuvering.

The design has sleeping accommodation for four people, with a double "V"-berth in the bow cabin and two straight settee berths in the main cabin. The galley is located on both sides, just aft of the bow cabin. The galley is equipped with a single-burner stove to port and sink to starboard. A 50 US qt (47 L) icebox doubles as the companionway step. The head is located in the bow cabin, under the "V"-berth. Cabin headroom is 48 in (122 cm).

The design has a PHRF racing average handicap of 282 and a hull speed of 5.6 kn (10.4 km/h).

== Reception ==
In a 2010 review Steve Henkel wrote, "the Montego 20 is based on the Montego 19 ... with slightly expanded dimensions and weight. She also has a two-foot deep stub keel in place of a swing keel, which adds 10" to her minimum draft. That in combination with her 2,300 lb. weight (versus 2,150 for the Montego 19) makes her less easily trailered than the Montego 19 ... Best features: She is said to track well, no doubt mainly because of her long stub keel. The seven-foot cockpit is roomy and has high coamings for good back support. Ventilation includes four opening ports in addition to a forward hatch and companionway hatch— great for summer climates. Her average PHRF of 282 seems a bit high, particularly against other similarly shallow fixed-keelers with more top hamper (above-the-water superstructure) like the Buccaneer 200 .... Worst features: Her very shallow keel can sideslip, especially in heavy air, reducing speed and pointing ability. The hardware as shipped is minimal; missing are a vang, cunningham, and quick-release jibsheet cleats, along with a better system for cleating the mainsheet. Her particular non-skid deck pattern can be slippery when wet."
