= Humboldt Township =

Humboldt Township may refer to the following places in the United States:

- Humboldt Township, Coles County, Illinois
- Humboldt Township, Humboldt County, Iowa
- Humboldt Township, Allen County, Kansas
- Humboldt Township, Michigan
- Humboldt Township, Clay County, Minnesota
- Humboldt Township, Minnehaha County, South Dakota
