= Islander 21 =

Sailboat class

Development
- Designer: Joseph McGlasson
- Location: United States
- Year: 1965
- Builder: McGlasson Marine/Wayfarer Yachts
- Name: Islander 21

Boat
- Displacement: 1,950 lb (885 kg)
- Draft: 3.33 ft (1.01 m)

Hull
- Type: monohull
- Construction: fiberglass
- LOA: 20.82 ft (6.35 m)
- LWL: 18.00 ft (5.49 m)
- Beam: 7.83 ft (2.39 m)
- Engine: outboard motor

Hull appendages
- Keel: fin keel
- Ballast: 1,000 lb (454 kg)
- Rudder: internally-mounted spade-type rudder

Rig
- Rig type: Bermuda rig
- I foretriangle height: 26.50 ft (8.08 m)
- J foretriangle base: 7.70 ft (2.35 m)
- P mainsail luff: 22.50 ft (6.86 m)
- E mainsail foot: 10.00 ft (3.05 m)

Sails
- Sailplan: masthead sloop
- Mainsail area: 112.50 sq ft (10.452 m^{2})
- Jib/genoa area: 102.03 sq ft (9.479 m^{2})
- Total sail area: 214.53 sq ft (19.930 m^{2})

Racing
- PHRF: 282

The Islander 21 is an American trailerable sailboat that was designed by Joseph McGlasson as a pocket cruiser and first built in 1965.

== Production ==
The design was built by McGlasson Marine/Wayfarer Yachts in the United States from 1965 to 1969, but it is now out of production.

== Design ==
The Islander 21 is a recreational keelboat built predominantly from fiberglass with wood trim. It has a masthead sloop rig, a spooned raked stem, an angled transom, an internally mounted spade-type rudder controlled by a tiller and a fixed fin keel. For sailing, the design is equipped with a jib or a genoa. The design has sleeping accommodations for four people with a double "V"-berth in the bow cabin and two straight settees in the main cabin along with a dinette table. It also has a galley and a head. Cabin headroom is 45 in (114 cm).

The boat displaces 1,950 lb (885 kg) and carries 1,000 lb (454 kg) of iron ballast. It has a draft of 3.33 ft (1.01 m) with the standard keel and is normally fitted with a small 3 to 6 hp (2 to 4 kW) outboard motor for docking and maneuvering. It has a PHRF racing average handicap of 282 and a hull speed of 5.7 kn (10.6 km/h).

== Operational history ==
In a 2010 review, Steve Henkel wrote, "we have no accommodations plan to show here, but her promotional literature says she 'is equipped with four full-length berths, galley, unusual dinette arrangement, modern head, and plenty of storage lockers.' That sounds good to us. The reported 1,000 pounds of ballast seems unusually large—more than half the total weight of the boat—leaving only 950 pounds for the hull, deck, rig, etc. That makes us wonder whether the numbers given in ads are incorrect ... Best and worst features: Not enough information available to comment."

== See also ==
- List of sailing boat types
