= Statue of Alexander von Humboldt (Stanford University) =

Statue in Stanford, California, U.S.

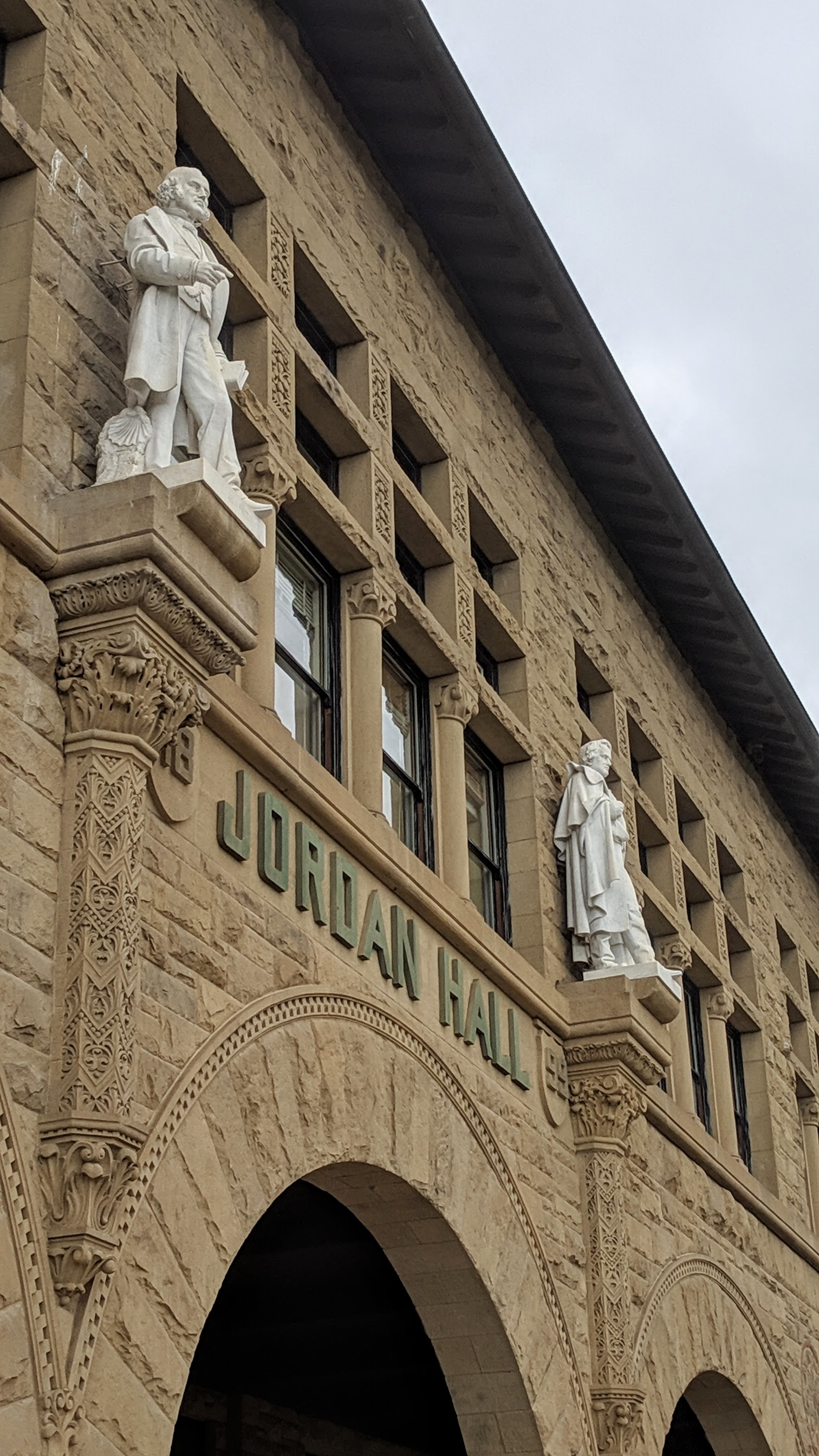
- Statues of Louis Agassiz (left) and Humboldt (right) on the exterior of Jordan Hall
- Subject: Alexander von Humboldt
- Location: Stanford, California, United States; 37.43°N 122.17°W

A statue of Alexander von Humboldt is installed on the exterior of Building 420 (formerly known as Jordan Hall), in Stanford University's Main Quad, in the U.S. state of California.

== See also ==
- Statue of Alexander von Humboldt (Begas), Berlin
