= Humboldt High School =

Humboldt High School may refer to:

- Humboldt High School (Iowa) — Humboldt, Iowa
- Humboldt High School (Kansas) — Humboldt, Kansas
- Humboldt High School (Tennessee) — Humboldt, Tennessee
- Humboldt Senior High School — Saint Paul, Minnesota
- Humboldt Collegiate, Humboldt, Saskatchewan
