= Watkins 25 =

1980s American recreational keelboat

Development
- Designer: Watkins Design Team
- Location: United States
- Year: 1983
- Builder: Watkins Yachts
- Name: Watkins 25

Boat
- Displacement: 4,800 lb (2,177 kg)
- Draft: 2.50 ft (0.76 m)

Hull
- Type: Monohull
- Construction: Fiberglass
- LOA: 24.92 ft (7.60 m)
- LWL: 21.00 ft (6.40 m)
- Beam: 8.50 ft (2.59 m)
- Engine: 7.5 to 15 hp (6 to 11 kW) outboard motor or 9 hp (7 kW) diesel engine

Hull appendages
- Keel: fin keel
- Ballast: 1,900 lb (862 kg)
- Rudder: internally-mounted spade-type rudder

Rig
- Rig type: Bermuda rig
- I foretriangle height: 29.00 ft (8.84 m)
- J foretriangle base: 10.50 ft (3.20 m)
- P mainsail luff: 24.25 ft (7.39 m)
- E mainsail foot: 9.00 ft (2.74 m)

Sails
- Sailplan: Masthead sloop
- Mainsail area: 109.13 sq ft (10.139 m^{2})
- Jib/genoa area: 152.25 sq ft (14.144 m^{2})
- Total sail area: 261.38 sq ft (24.283 m^{2})

Racing
- PHRF: 243

The Watkins 25, is a recreational keelboat built by Watkins Yachts in Clearwater, Florida. About 183 were produced from 1983 to 1989.

The design was later sold to Com-Pac Yachts and was developed into the Com-Pac 25.

The fiberglass hull has raked stem, a vertical transom, an internally mounted spade-type rudder controlled by a tiller and a fixed fin keel.

The boat has a draft of 4.00 ft (1.22 m) with the deep keel and 2.50 ft (0.76 m) with the optional shoal draft keel. The deep draft keel was developed at the request of a customer by cutting off the old keel mould and making a new one for a cast lead keel. Only a few were produced, probably between two and five.

Each boat was custom-built to the buyer's specifications, so the fleet varies in options and features. A bow-mounted anchor platform was optional. When mounted, a different pulpit was used and the forestay was shortened to accommodate the wooden platform, but retained the same attachment point and sail plan. Other options include a flushing head, pressurized water, a hot water tank and a reboarding ladder.

The design's hull is molded in a single piece using polyester resin and fiberglass woven roving, as well as multidirectional chopped strand fibers (MSCF). The keel is integral to the hull and the ballast is internal to the keel. The deck and the cockpit and also moulded in one piece, also using polyester resin and fiberglass woven roving with MCSF. Plywood coring is employed for the cabin top, deck, seat and the cockpit sole for stiffness. The hull-to-deck joint is flanged, glued and then screwed into place. There is an aluminum toe rail, stainless steel through-bolted into place, bonding the toe rail, deck and the hull.

It a masthead sloop rig. The spars are all coated 6061-T6 aluminum extrusions. There is a single reefing point. The mainsheet design involved two blocks, one on each side or the cabin top, although many have been modified to a mainsheet traveler.

An anchor well is located at the bow with a hawspipe leading the anchor chain into the "V" berth locker. The main cabin has 71 in (180 cm) of headroom and is finished with hand-rubbed teak trim, with the bulkheads and cabinetry made from teak veneer on plywood. The main cabin sole is teak and holly veneer over plywood.

Ventilation on early boats was provided by two opening plastic framed ports with integral screens and on later boats built three aluminum framed ports, also with integral screens. All boats also have an extruded aluminum framed Bomar forward deck hatch.

The design has a hull speed of 6.1 kn (11.3 km/h).

== Reception ==
In a 2010 review Steve Henkel wrote, "best features: At 5' 11" the boat has the best headroom among her comp[etitor]s. Her extruded and perforated aluminum toe rail is handy for easy placement of genoa blocks and fenders. Worst features: The very shallow (2' 6") keel is convenient but prevents good upwind performance; a deep-keel version was available toward the end of the boat’s production run but didn’t attract many buyers. The rudder depth looks a bit low to us, and therefore might give control problems under adverse weather conditions."
