= Statue of Alexander von Humboldt (Mexico City) =

Statue in Mexico City, Mexico

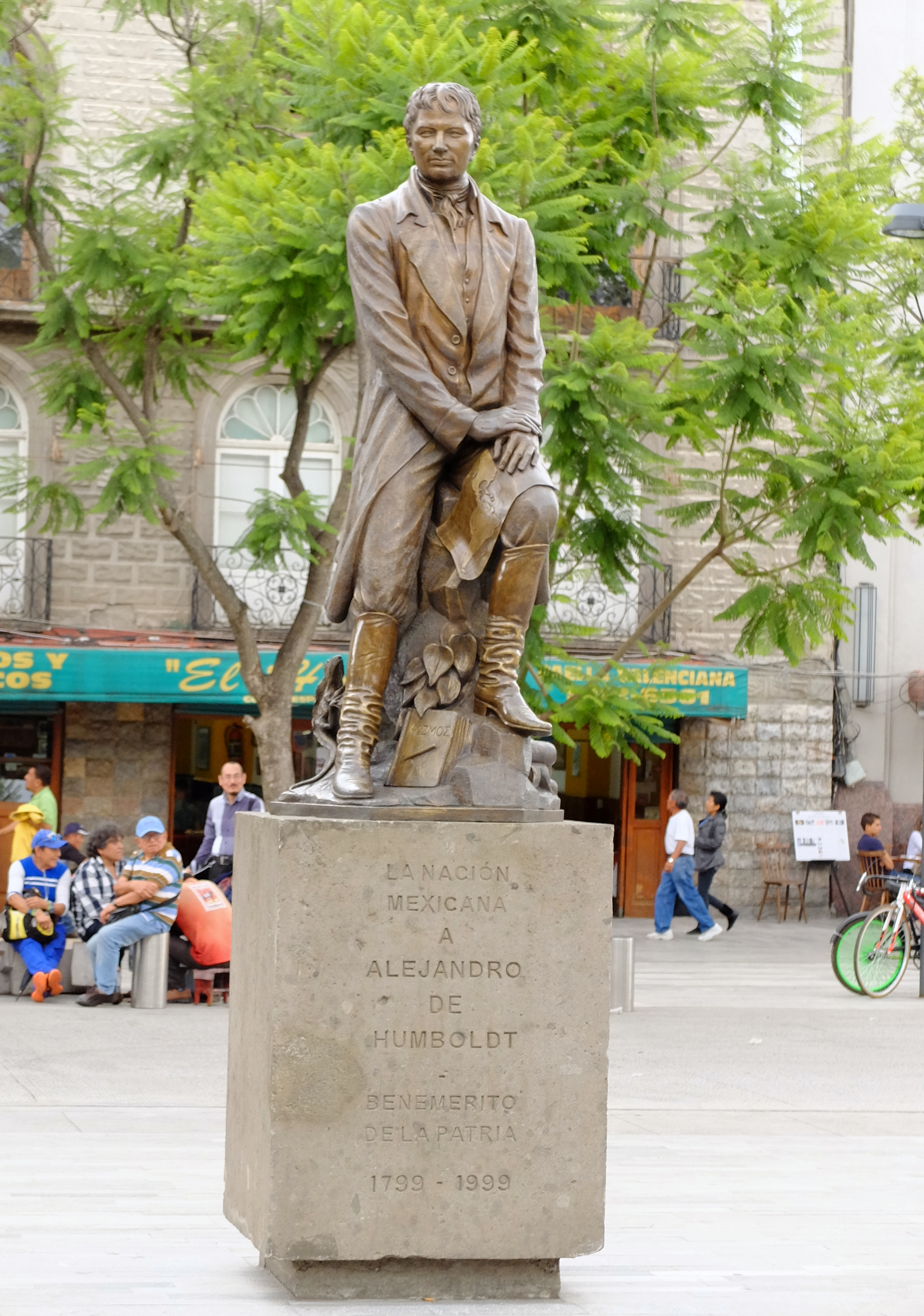
- The statue in 2015
- Location in Mexico City
- Subject: Alexander von Humboldt
- Location: Mexico City, Mexico; 19°26′9.79″N 99°8′45.94″W

The statue of Alexander von Humboldt is installed in Mexico City's Alameda Central, in Mexico. The base has the inscription, "La Nación Mexicana a Alejandro de Humboldt – Benemerito de la Patria 1799–1999". The statue was built after Humboldt visited Mexico.
