= Humboldt (steamer) =

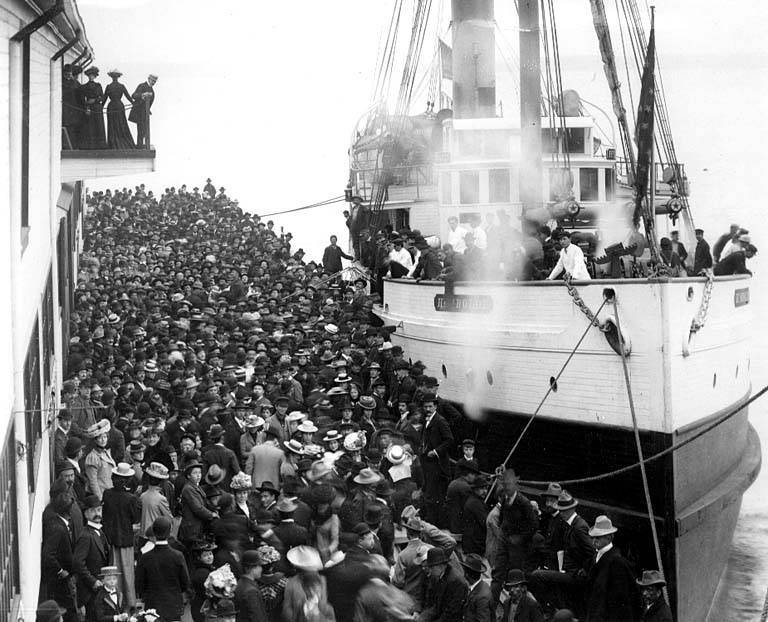
- Humboldt departing for Nome, Alaska, in 1901

History

United States
- Name: Humboldt
- Builder: Eureka, California
- Launched: 1896
- Acquired: White Flyer Line, 1919; The Los Angeles San Francisco Navigation Company, 1927
- Out of service: 1932

General characteristics
- Class & type: Wooden steamer
- Tons burthen: 1,075 long tons (1,092 t)
- Length: 213 ft 1 in (64.95 m)
- Beam: 31 ft (9.4 m)
- Draft: 15 ft 7 in (4.75 m)
- Sail plan: 2 masts
- Complement: 36 crew members, 140 passengers

Humboldt was a wooden steamer built in Eureka, California, in 1896. She sailed on the Alaska route for many years, and operated between San Francisco and Los Angeles between 1919 and 1932, when she was withdrawn from service. She was purchased by the White Flyer Line in 1919, and by the Los Angeles San Francisco Navigation Company in 1927.
