= Universal Marine =

American sailboat manufacturer

Universal Marine Corporation
- Company type: Privately held company
- Industry: Boat building
- Founded: 1960
- Founder: Johannes "Jopie" Helsen
- Headquarters: Saint Petersburg, Florida, United States
- Products: Sailboats

Universal Marine was an American boat builder based in Saint Petersburg, Florida. The company specialized in the design and manufacture of fiberglass sailboats.

The company was founded by Johannes "Jopie" Helsen in 1960 as the Helsen Yacht Corporation.

== History ==
The company was founded as a marina management business and later expanded into boat design and building as a side-business. The first design produced was the Helsen 22 in 1971, followed in 1974 by the Helsen 20. The swing keel Montego 19 and its fixed keel derivative, the Montego 20 were produced first in 1976.

The final and largest boat built, the Montego 25, started production in 1980 and was produced until 1985, with 80 boats completed. In a 2010 review, Steve Henkel wrote about Helsen's Montego 25 design, "this one may have been his best effort ... properly sailed will give good performance on the race course ... We used to race against a Montego 25 in our Morgan 24/25 ... and although we won the season trophy once or twice based on the average of our scores, we were never able to beat the Montego, either boat for boat or on corrected time. She is fast, we observed, both light and heavy air ...."

Boat production ended in 1985 and the company is now listed as "inactive".

== Boats ==
Summary of boats built by Universal Marine:

- Helsen 22 - 1971
- Helsen 20 - 1974
- Montego 19 - 1976
- Montego 20 - 1976
- Montego 25 - 1980

== See also ==
- List of sailboat designers and manufacturers
