= Islander (steamboat) =

American steamboat

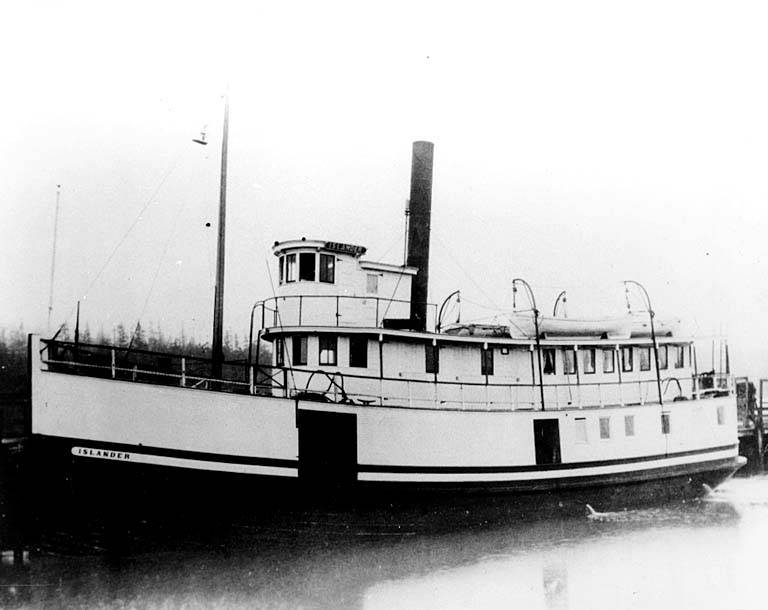

History
- Name: Islander
- Route: Puget Sound, San Juan Islands
- Builder: J.A. Scribner
- In service: 1904-1924
- Identification: US registry 201240
- Fate: Stranded 1924 near Santa Cruz, California

General characteristics
- Type: inland steamboat
- Tonnage: 163 gross tons, 87 registered tons
- Length: 72 ft (21.95 m)
- Beam: 15.5 ft (4.72 m)
- Depth: 5.4 ft (1.65 m)
- Installed power: steam engine, 200 indicated HP
- Propulsion: propeller

The steamboat Islander (1) operated in the early 1900s as part of the Puget Sound Mosquito Fleet. Islander (1) a steamboat built in 1904, should not be confused with Islander (2), an 89' long motor passenger/freight boat built in 1921 for service on the same route.

== Construction ==
Islander was built in 1904 by J.A. Scribner at Newhall, Washington for Capt. Andrew Newhall. Islander was intended to replace the Buckeye on the Bellingham Bay-San Juan Islands route. Islander was 72 feet long, with beam of 18.9 feet and a 9 foot depth of hold. In overall size the vessel was 163 gross tons and 87 registered tons. In 1909 the vessel required a crew of seven. The steam engine generated 200 indicated horsepower.

== Operations ==
Capt. Newhall ran Islander on the San Juan Islands mail route until about 1909 when John S. McMillan, of Roche Harbor formed the San Juan Navigation Co., which placed the steamer Vashonian on the run from Seattle to Roche Harbor, where travelers could transship to the steamer Burton to proceed further to Bellingham. In 1910, when Captain Newhall’s mail contract expired, he could not compete with the well-financed San Juan Navigation Co., and Islander was forced to tie up at Decatur Island. Islander had also encountered tough competition from Capt. William H. Kasch, who running the 65' long gasoline-powered launch Yankee Doodle was able to race ahead of Islander, beating her to all the landings and picking up cargo and passengers before Islander could get to the dock.

== Sale to Mexican interests ==
Captain Basford and his son charted Islander for a while and ran Islander on the San Juan Islands route, however they did not succeed and Islander was sold to a Mexican concern. How long Islander remained in Mexico is unknown, although she appears to have either never been transferred or at least returned by 1920 or so, when the vessel was transferred from Puget Sound to California. Another source indicates that the sale to Mexican owners did not happen until about 1920.

== Loss ==
The coastwise steamer La Feliz(formerly Islander), grounded near Watsonville, California with a sizable cargo of Fireman's Fund-insured sardines aboard. Artichoke rancher who owned the land wanted $500 to let the salvors cross his land; under marine law no payment is required. Rancher kept them off first with a rifle, later by flooding the access road. Expediency overrule principle and the Company paid.
