= Watkins 29 =

Sailboat class

Development
- Designer: Walter Scott and Watkins brothers
- Location: United States
- Year: 1984
- No. built: 60
- Builder: Watkins Yachts

Boat
- Displacement: 8,800 lb (3,992 kg)
- Draft: 4.00 ft (1.22 m)

Hull
- Type: Monohull
- Construction: Fiberglass
- LOA: 28.92 ft (8.81 m)
- LWL: 24.00 ft (7.32 m)
- Beam: 10.33 ft (3.15 m)
- Engine: Yanmar 2GM diesel engine

Hull appendages
- Keel: fin keel
- Ballast: 3,900 lb (1,769 kg)
- Rudder: skeg-mounted rudder

Rig
- Rig type: Bermuda rig
- I foretriangle height: 36.50 ft (11.13 m)
- J foretriangle base: 11.80 ft (3.60 m)
- P mainsail luff: 31.00 ft (9.45 m)
- E mainsail foot: 10.00 ft (3.05 m)

Sails
- Sailplan: Masthead sloop
- Mainsail area: 155.00 sq ft (14.400 m^{2})
- Jib/genoa area: 215.35 sq ft (20.007 m^{2})
- Total sail area: 370.35 sq ft (34.407 m^{2})

The Watkins 29, also known as the W29, is an American sailboat that was designed by Walter Scott in conjunction with the Watkins brothers and first built in 1984.

The Watkins 29 design had a minor design change to the transom in 1987 and was renamed the Watkins 30, also known as the W30.

== Production ==
The design was built by Watkins Yachts in Clearwater, Florida, United States, but it is now out of production. A total of 60 W29s were completed between 1984 and 1988, while 28 W30s were completed between 1987 and 1989. The last W30 completed was moulded in April 1989 as a 1990 model.

== Design ==
The Watkins 29 and 30 are recreational keelboats, built predominantly of fiberglass, with wood trim. They have a masthead sloop rig, a raked stem, a nearly vertical transom on the W29 and a reverse transom on the W30, a partial skeg-mounted rudder controlled by a tiller and a fixed fin keel. Both models displace 8,800 lb (3,992 kg) and carry 3,900 lb (1,769 kg) of ballast.

The design has a draft of 4.00 ft (1.22 m) with the standard keel fitted.

The design's hull is molded in a single piece using polyester resin and fiberglass woven roving, as well as multidirectional chopped strand fibers (MSCF). The keel is integral to the hull and the ballast is internal to the keel. The deck and the cockpit are moulded in one piece, also using polyester resin and fiberglass woven roving with MCSF. Plywood coring is employed for the cabin top, deck, seat and the cockpit sole for stiffness. The hull-to-deck joint is flanged, glued and then screwed into place. There is an aluminum toe rail, stainless steel through-bolted into place, bonding the toe rail, deck and the hull.

An anchor well is located at the bow with a hawspipe leading the anchor chain into the "V" berth locker.

The boat is fitted with a 18 hp (13 kW) Japanese Yanmar 2GM or 27 hp (20 kW) 3GM diesel engine for docking and maneuvering. The fuel tank holds 20 U.S. gallons (76 L; 17 imp gal) and the fresh water tank has a capacity of 40 U.S. gallons (150 L; 33 imp gal).

Sleeping accommodation is provided for five people, with an aft cabin and a bow "V"-berth, both doubles. The main cabin has a quarter berth or optional double pull-out berth. The head is on the port side, aft of the bow "V"-berth and has pressurized water and a shower. The galley is at the bottom of the companionway stairs to starboard and includes a sink, stove and an icebox.

Ventilation is provided by eight opening ports and one deck-mounted hatch. The main cabin has 75 in (191 cm) of headroom and is finished with hand-rubbed teak trim, with the bulkheads and cabinetry made from teak veneer on plywood. The main cabin sole is teak and holly veneer over plywood.

The design has a hull speed of 6.57 kn (12.17 km/h).

== Operational history ==
The boat is supported by an active class club, the Watkins Owners.

== See also ==
- List of sailing boat types
