= Islander 24 =

Sailboat class

Development
- Designer: Joseph McGlasson
- Location: United States
- Year: 1961
- Builder: McGlasson Marine/Islander Yachts
- Name: Islander 24

Boat
- Displacement: 4,200 lb (1,905 kg)
- Draft: 3.40 ft (1.04 m)

Hull
- Type: Monohull
- Construction: Fiberglass
- LOA: 24.00 ft (7.32 m)
- LWL: 20.00 ft (6.10 m)
- Beam: 8.00 ft (2.44 m)

Hull appendages
- Keel: fin keel
- Ballast: 1,600 lb (726 kg)
- Rudder: keel-mounted rudder

Rig
- Rig type: Bermuda rig
- I foretriangle height: 28.80 ft (8.78 m)
- J foretriangle base: 8.40 ft (2.56 m)
- P mainsail luff: 25.80 ft (7.86 m)
- E mainsail foot: 11.50 ft (3.51 m)

Sails
- Sailplan: Masthead sloop
- Mainsail area: 148.35 sq ft (13.782 m^{2})
- Jib/genoa area: 120.96 sq ft (11.238 m^{2})
- Total sail area: 269.31 sq ft (25.020 m^{2})

The Islander 24 is an American sailboat first built in 1961.

The Islander 24 is a fiberglass development of the wooden-hulled Catalina Islander. The design was developed into the Islander 24 Bahama in 1964.

== Development ==
McGlasson approached Glas Laminates to build a version of his wooden Catalina Islander in fiberglass. The mold was created by using the hull of one of the wooden boats and the resulting fiberglass boats retained the distinctive wooden board imprints from the mold. The Islander 24 features a trunk cabin, but the raised deck Islander 24 Bahama version proved a bigger commercial success and the Islander 24 had a relatively short production run.

== Production ==
The design was built by McGlasson Marine/Islander Yachts in the United States from 1961 to 1967, but it is now out of production.

== Design ==
Designed by Joseph McGlasson, the Islander 24 is a recreational keelboat, built predominantly of fiberglass, with wood trim. It has a masthead sloop rig, a spooned raked stem, a raised transom, a keel-mounted rudder controlled by a tiller and a fixed fin keel. It displaces 4,200 lb (1,905 kg) and carries 1,600 lb (726 kg) of lead ballast.

The boat has a draft of 3.40 ft (1.04 m) with the standard keel fitted.

The design has a hull speed of 5.99 kn (11.09 km/h).
