= Alexander von Humboldt Memorial, Berlin =

Public sculpture in Berlin

Alexander von Humboldt Memorial
- Alexander-von-Humboldt-Denkmal (German)
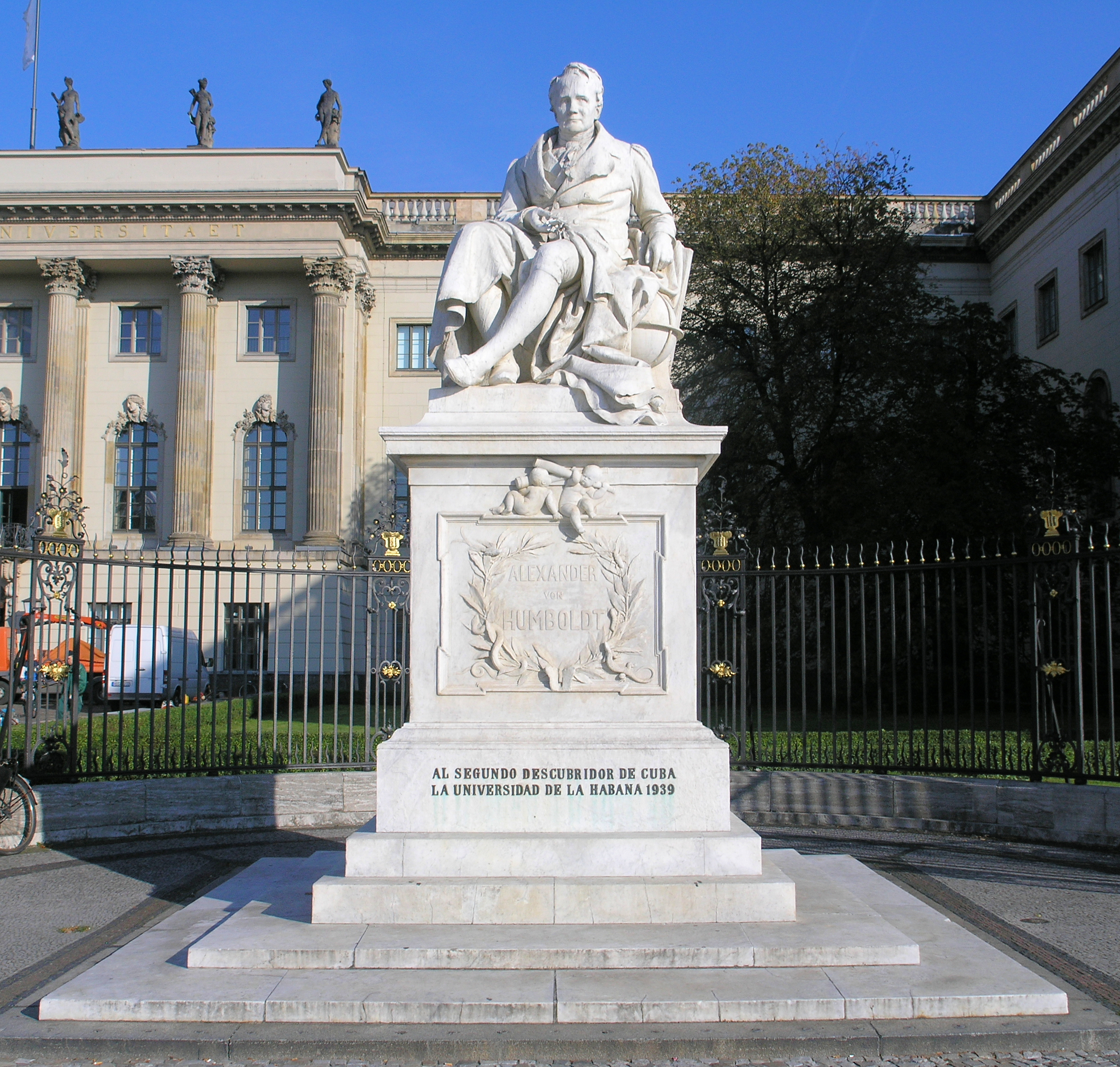
- Artist: Reinhold Begas
- Year: 1882
- Medium: Marble
- Dimensions: 5.70 m (18.7 ft)
- Location: Unter den Linden, Berlin, Germany; 52.5176°N 13.3940°E

The Alexander von Humboldt Memorial to the right of the Humboldt University main building on Unter den Linden avenue in Berlin's Mitte district commemorates the Prussian polymath and natural scientist Alexander von Humboldt (1769–1859). Created in 1882 by Reinhold Begas in neo-baroque style, the marble statue is a masterpiece of the Berlin school of sculpture.

== Gallery ==
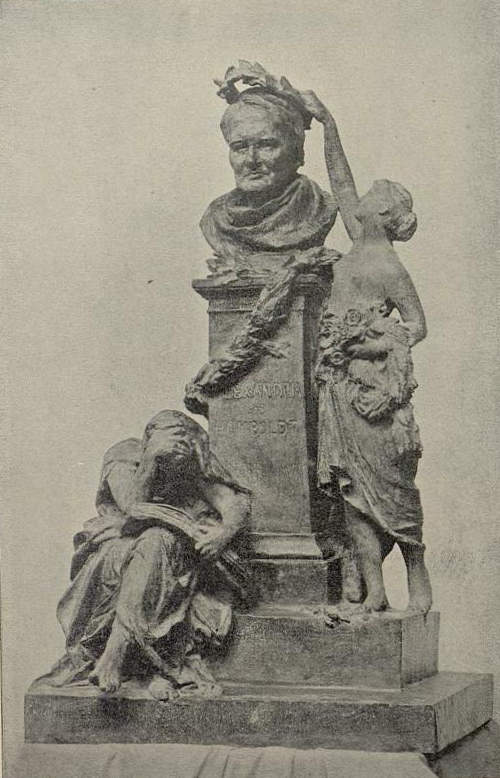
Early model by Reinhold Begas

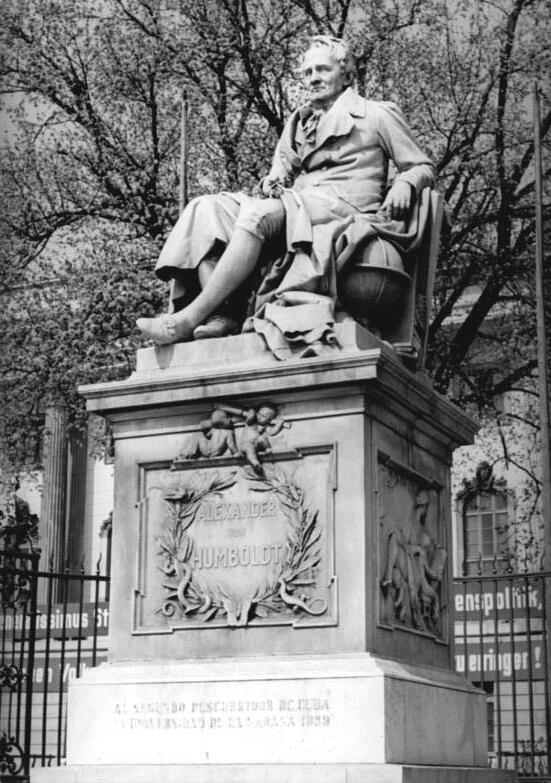
Marble statue in 1952

Humboldt University main building
