= Columbia Yachts =

Sailboat manufacturer in California

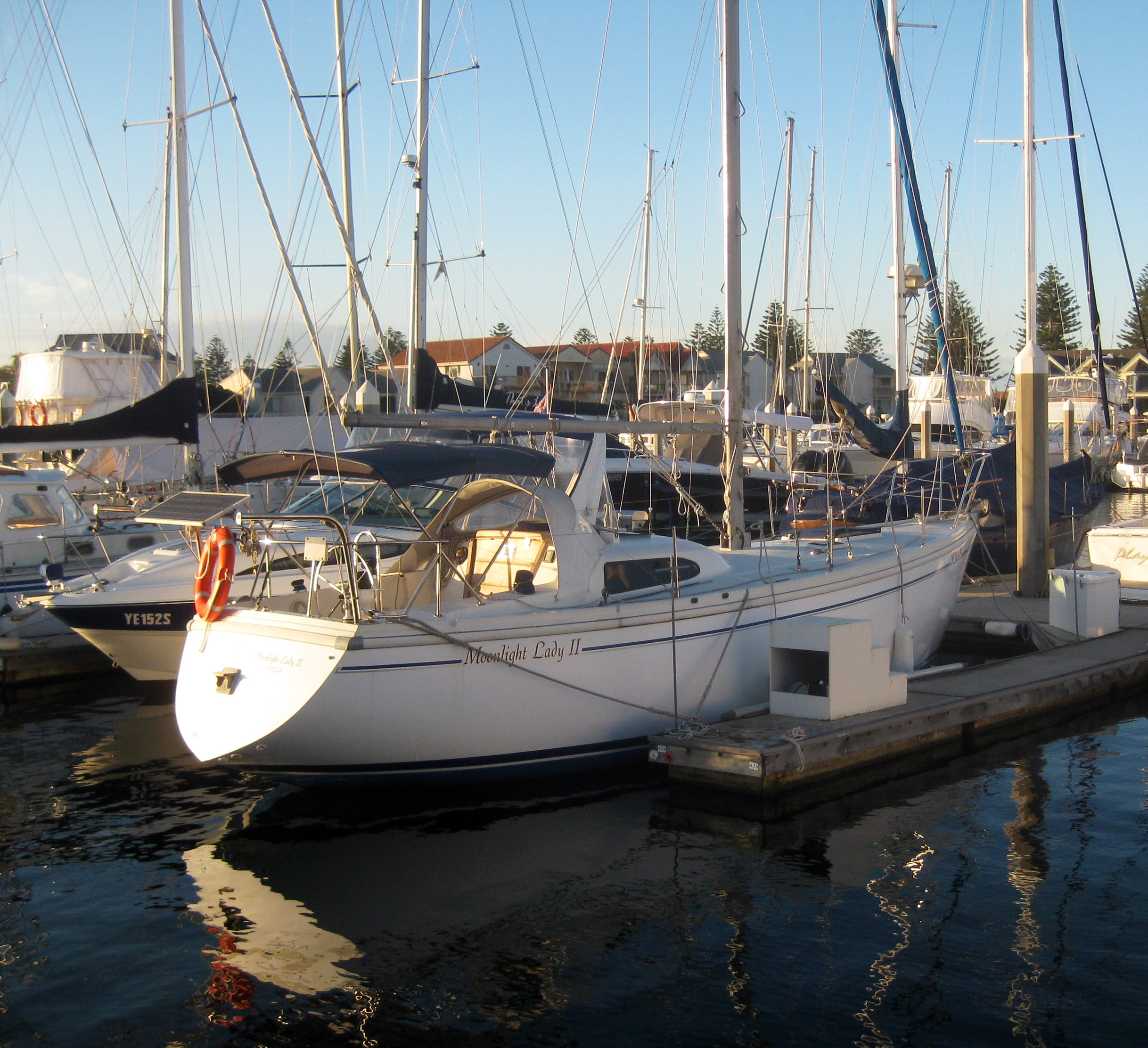
- Columbia 34 Mark II
- Formerly: Glass Laminates and Glass Marine Industries (GMI)
- Industry: Fiberglass boats
- Founded: 1958; 68 years ago in United States
- Founder: Richard "Dick" Valdes and Maurice V. Thrienen
- Defunct: 28 September 2011
- Owner: Whittaker Marine Group

Columbia Yachts is a US manufacturer of sailboats, with offices and production facilities in Southern California.

== History ==
Richard “Dick” Valdes and Maurice V. Threinen founded Glass Laminates, a fiberglass contract company, in 1958. Among the early products were camper shells and producing canoes for Sears. The company eventually focused its development expertise on sailboats and became Glass Marine Industries (GMI), marketing their boats under the Columbia nameplate. Early models included the Columbia 24 and Columbia 29 (Sparkman & Stephens design). By 1964 company sales passed $2.5 Million.

In 1965, GMI changed its name to Columbia, and introduced the Columbia 50, at the time the world's largest fiberglass production sailboat. The classic beauty, exceptional comfort, and race performance made this design a success. During the mid sixties Columbia produced a few motor yachts.

By the late 1960s, the company was the world's largest fiberglass sailboat manufacturer, with manufacturing plants throughout the world. Valdes and Threinen sold the company to Whittaker (listed on the NYSE), but Valdes continued as president of the subsidiary Columbia Yacht Corporation, and helped to develop Whittaker Marine Group, which ultimately included Bertram Yachts, Trojan Yachts, Riva, Desco Marine, Kettenburg, Balboa Marine, and Coronado Yachts. Total sales of the Whittaker Marine Group reached between $250 and $350 Million in the early 70's during Valdes' tenure. A side note is that Frank Butler, the owner of Coronado Yachts came into Whittaker with the merger, but left about a year later to form Catalina Yachts.

Following Dick Valdes' departure from Columbia Yachts in 1972, the company offices and plant were relocated to Virginia, and eventually sold to Hughes Boat Works based in Huron Park, Ontario, Canada in 1979, and later to Aura Yachts also based in Huron Park, Ontario in 1982. In the mid-80s Canadian boat designer Howard Hughes regained control of the company. Eventually, the Columbia Yachts brand faded into history.

== Columbia Yachts today ==
In September, 2001 the new Columbia Yacht Corporation was incorporated, with Dick's son Vincent Valdes as President and CEO, co-founder Justin Wallin as COO and with Dick Valdes among the founding directors. The new company’s first offering was the Columbia 30 Sports Sailor, designed by Tim Kernan, with a Southern California OWC PHRF rating of 51. The company currently produces the Carbon 32 and Antrim 25.

== Models ==
=== Classic models ===
- Columbia 10.7
- Columbia 21
- Columbia 22
- Columbia T-23
- Columbia 24
- Columbia 24 Challenger
- Columbia 24 Contender
- Columbia T-26
- Columbia 26-1 IB
- Columbia 26-2 IB
- Columbia 26-2 OB
- Columbia 28-1
- Columbia 29-2
- Columbia 30
- Columbia 31
- Columbia 32
- Columbia 34-1
- Columbia 34-2
- Columbia 36
- Columbia 38
- Columbia 40
- Columbia 43-1
- Columbia 43-2
- Columbia 43-3
- Columbia 45 Sloop
- Columbia 45 Ketch
- Columbia 5.5
- Columbia 5.5
- Columbia 50
- Columbia 7.6
- Columbia 8.3
- Columbia 8.7
- Columbia 9.6
- Columbia Sabre

=== New models ===
- Columbia 30 Sports Yacht
- Carbon 32
- Antrim 25

== See also ==
- List of sailboat designers and manufacturers
