= List of schooners =

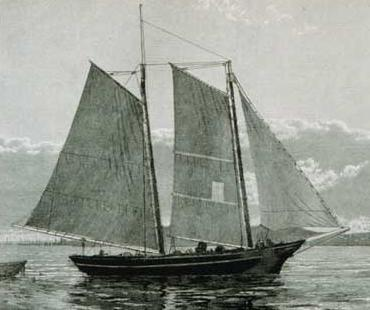
A small fishing schooner

The following are notable schooner-rigged vessels.

== Active schooners ==
Name	Image	Built	Flag & home port	Description	Rig	Notes
A. J. Meerwald		1928	(United States) Bivalve, New Jersey	Educational vessel and state ship of New Jersey; former oyster schooner	2 masted gaff	
Adventure		1926	(United States) Gloucester, Massachusetts	National Historic Landmark former Grand Banks fishing schooner	2 masted gaff knockabout	
Adventurer-56 (formerly Blue Max)		1984	(United States) Annapolis, Maryland	Privately owned	Staysail	
Adventuress		1914	(United States) Port Townsend, Washington	National Historic Landmark former pilot boat	2 masted gaff	
Alabama		1926	(United States) Vineyard Haven, Massachusetts	Tourism vessel, former pilot boat	2 masted gaff	
Alaska Rover		1989	(United States) Resurrection Bay, Alaska	Working schooner plying the tourism trade.	2 masted gaff rigged, topsail schooner.	
Albanus		1988	(Finland) Mariehamn, Åland	Sail training vessel, replica of a 1904 freighter	2 masted gaff	
Alma		1891	(United States) San Francisco	National Historic Landmark former cargo scow	2 masted gaff	
Alma Doepel		1903	(Australia) Melbourne, Victoria	Former commercial and sail training vessel, currently under repair	3 masted gaff, square topsail	
Amazing Grace		1981	(United States) San Diego, California	Education/sail training ship for Maritime leadership	2 masted gaff and staysails, square topsail	
American Eagle		1930	(United States) Rockland, Maine	National Historic Landmark Gloucester schooner	2 masted gaff	
American Pride		1941	(United States) Long Beach, California	Education/sail training vessel; former fishing boat	3 masted gaff	
American Rover		1986	(United States) Norfolk, Virginia	Working schooner providing tours for up to 150 passengers.	3 masted topsail schooner	
American Spirit		1991	(United States) Washington, D.C.	Education and excursion vessel	2 masted gaff	
Amistad		2000	(United States) New Haven, Connecticut	Education vessel	2 masted gaff, square topsail	
Anne (formerly Tantra Schooner)		1978		Privately owned by Reid Stowe	2 masted gaff	
Antonina (formerly Robert Emit)		1986	(United States) Townsends Inlet, New Jersey	Privately owned	Staysail	
Appledore IV		1989	(United States) Bay City, Michigan	Tourism/charter vessel/Science Under Sail programs	2 masted gaff	
Aquidneck (schooner)		2005	Newport, RI	Tourism/private charter vessel	2 masted gaff	
Ardelle		2011	Gloucester, MA	Tourism and Educational Sailing Vessel built by Harold Burnham	2 masted gaff	
Argia		1986	(United States) Mystic, Connecticut	Tourism/charter vessel	2 masted gaff	
Argo		2006	(British Virgin Islands) Road Town, Tortola	Education/sail training vessel	2 masted Marconi/ staysail	
Atalanta		1901	(Germany) Wismar	Education/sail training and charter vessel	2 masted gaff	
Athos		2010		World's largest two-mast schooner at launch	2-mast Bermuda	
Atlantic		2010	Douglas, Isle of Man	Replica of racing yacht Atlantic (William Gardner, 1903)	3 mast gaff	
Atyla		1984	Badalona, Spain	Sail training vessel (Civil)	2 masted schooner, staysail	
Belle Poule		1932	(France) Brest	Naval training vessel	2 masted gaff, square topsail	
Bill of Rights		1971	(United States) Chula Vista, California	Modeled after schooner Wanderer (1858); privately owned; commercial charters; sail training vessel; 100 ton captain training.	2 masted gaff; topsail schooner	
Black Douglas		1930	Morocco	Privately owned; former school ship	3 masted Marconi/staysail schooner	
Bluenose II		1963	(Canada) Lunenburg, Nova Scotia	Replica of racing/fishing schooner Bluenose	2 masted gaff	
BlueTopaz		1983	(Canada) Kingston, Ontario	Privately owned, currently sailing out of Tobermory, Canada.	2 masted gaff	
Bonny Rover			(United States) Norfolk, Virginia	Privately owned		
Bowdoin		1921	(United States) Castine, Maine	National Historic Landmark arctic exploration/sail training vessel	2 masted gaff knockabout	
Brabander		1977	Klaipėda, Lithuania	Klaipėda University training ship.	2 masted topsail-gaff	
Brilliant		1932	(United States) Mystic, Connecticut	Sail training vessel		
C.A. Thayer		1895	(United States) San Francisco	National Historic Landmark former lumber/fishing boat	3 masted gaff/Marconi mizzen	
Californian		1984	(United States) San Diego	Education/sail training replica of C.W. Lawrence	2 masted gaff, square topsail	
Cape Cleare		1983	(United States) Port Townsend, Washington	Active West Coast Trolling Schooner	Marconi Mainmast/Gaff Foremast	
Cartagena		1983	United States Milwaukee	Privately Owned	2 Masted Gaff	
Cashier		1849	(United States) Bivalve, New Jersey	Oldest schooner in the United States, oldest operational fishing vessel in the United States, and holder of New Jersey Oyster License No. 1; being restored by the Bayshore Discovery Project		
Challenge			(Canada) Toronto, Ontario	Charter boat	3 masted Marconi/staysail	
Charlotte		2007	(United States) Vineyard Haven, Massachusetts	Built over the course of three and a half years at the Gannon & Benjamin yard, Vineyard Haven, Massachusetts, by and for Nathaniel Benjamin	2 masted gaff	
Charm		2010	Belfast, Maine	Designed by Pete Culler and constructed in Camden, Maine between 1998 and 2010 by Ned Ackerman. Operating as a commercial day sailing vessel in Belfast, Maine.	2 masted gaff	
Clipper City		1984	(United States) New York City	Replica of eponymous Great Lakes cargo boat	2 masted gaff, square topsail	
Columbia		2014	(United States) Panama City, Florida	Columbia is an exact replica of the 1923 Gloucester fishing and racing schooner of the same name. She is a privately owned vessel. Her lines have been converted from wood to steel, and she was built by the owner in his shipyard Eastern Shipbuilding Group Inc. |	Gaff	
Coronet		1885	(United States) Brooklyn, New York/Newport, Rhode Island	A 190 ft (58 m), 230 ton, wooden-hull Schooner Yacht built in 1885 in Brooklyn, New York for racing, is one of the oldest and largest schooner yachts in the world	two masts	
Creole		1927	(Spain) Palma, Majorca	World's longest wooden yacht, refitted by Cantiere Navale Ferrari-Signani	three masted staysail	
Downeast Rover		1983	(United States) Manteo, North Carolina	Privately owned tourism vessel. 55' steel-hull construction. Designed by Merritt Walter as a part of his Rover series of schooners.	2 masted gaff topsail	
Denis Sullivan		2000	(United States) Milwaukee, Wisconsin	Education/sail training/tourism vessel	3 masted gaff	
Eendracht		1989	(Netherlands) Rotterdam	Education/sail training/tourism vessel	3 masted gaff	
Egret		1886	(United States) The Barnacle Historic State Park	Replica of a 28' sailboat designed and built by the early Coconut Grove pioneer Ralph Munroe	2 masted sharpie	
Ernestina-Morrissey		1894	(United States) New Bedford, Massachusetts	National Historic Landmark former fishing/arctic exploration/packet boat	2 masted gaff	
Eleonora		2000	(United Kingdom) London	Replica of the racing schooner Westward (Herreshoff, 1910)	2 masted gaff, yard topsail	
Elena		2009	(United Kingdom) London	Replica of the racing schooner Elena (Herreshoff, 1911)	2 masted gaff, yard topsail	
Elizabeth		1914	(Netherlands)	The Tallship Company acquired it in 1991 and based it in Franeker	3 masted	
Empire Sandy		1943	(Canada) Thunder Bay	Tourism vessel; former British tugboat rebuilt as schooner	3 masted gaff, square topsails	
Enterprize		1997	(Australia) Melbourne, Victoria	Replica of 1829 cargo ship	2 masted gaff, square topsail	
Evelina M. Goulart		1927	(United States) Essex, Massachusetts	Awaiting restoration; former fishing boat	2 masted gaff, currently downrigged	
HMS Falken (S02)		1946	(Sweden) Karlskrona	Naval sail training vessel, with Gladan	2 masted gaff	
Fame		2003	(United States) Essex, Massachusetts	Replica of the 1812 privateer schooner which captured the first prizes of the War of 1812 Built by Harold Burnham	2 masted gaff	
Freda B		1991	(United States) Sausalito, California	Charter boat designed by legendary East Coast naval architect, Charles Wittholtz.	2 masted gaff rigged, topsail	
Gallant		1916	(Netherlands) Amsterdam		2 masted gaff	
Gas Light		2000	(United States) San Francisco, California	Replica of the 1874 scow schooner by same name, rebuilt in steel by Billy Martinelli	2 masted gaff	
HMS Gladan (S01)		1947	Karlskrona, Sweden	Naval sail training vessel, with Falken	2 masted gaff	
Governor Stone		1877	(United States) Fort Walton Beach, Florida	National Historic Landmark; oldest surviving Gulf schooner	2 masted gaff	
Grace Bailey		1882	(United States) Camden, Maine	National Historic Landmark former lumber boat	2 masted gaff	
Harvey Gamage		1973	(United States) Portland, Maine	Education/sail training vessel	2 masted gaff	
Helena		1946	Oslo, Norway	Tourism/charter vessel	2 masted gaff	
Helena		1992	Turku, Finland	Steel, LOA 38,7 m. Commissioned and run by STAF / Sail Training Association Finland on Finnish and international voyages. Participating in The Tall Ships Races (winner B-Class in 2007 & 2011).Crew: 4 plus 24 trainees.	2 masted, staysails	
Helena C		1968	Cayman Islands	Privately owned; former sail training vessel	3 masted gaff/Marconi mizzen, square topsails	
Heritage	Schooner Heritage	1983	(United States) Rockland, Maine	Hosts up to 30 passengers	2 masted coaster	
Highlander Sea		1924	(United States) Port Huron, Michigan	Sail training/education and tourism vessel; former pilot boat	2 masted gaff	
Hindu		1925	(United States) Key West, Florida	Tourism/charter vessel in Key West in the winters and Provincetown, Massachusetts in the summers. Designed as a half-scale model of a Grand Banks fishing schooner.	2 masted gaff	
Isaac H. Evans		1886	(United States) Rockland, Maine	National Historic Landmark, oldest surviving oyster schooner	2 masted gaff	
Isabella		2005	Gloucester, MA	Commissioned in 2005 as a personal sailing vessel it was returned to builder Harold Burnham in 2021 and it now runs as a charter vessel	2 masted gaff	
J. & E. Riggin		1927	(United States) Rockland, Maine	National Historic Landmark former oyster boat	2 masted gaff	
J.R. Tolkien		1964	(Netherlands) Amsterdam	Luxury chartership and naval trainingvessel.		
Jacob Meindert		1952	(Netherlands) Makkum, Súdwest-Fryslân		2 masted gaff, square topsail	
Kajama		1930	(Canada) Toronto, Ontario	Charter boat, former German coastal trader	3 masted gaff	
Kathleen and May		1900	(United Kingdom) Bideford, Devon	Privately owned coastal trader. Built 1900 at Connah's Quay. Sold to Martin Fleming of Youghall. Named Kathleen and May after his daughters. A coal lugger on the Irish Sea. Restored 2000 by Paul Davis. Delivered "reduced carbon footprint" wine cargo from France to Dublin in 2008. Currently (November 2015) residing at Albert Dock, Merseyside Maritime Museum.	3 masted gaff, square fore mast topsails	
L. A. Dunton		1921	(United States) Mystic, Connecticut	National Historic Landmark former Essex fishing boat	2 masted gaff	
Ladona	Schooner Ladona, Built in 1922	1922	(United States) Rockland, Maine	Charter vessel, former private yacht, WWII sub patrol. Rebuilt 2015	2 masted gaff	
Lady Maryland		1985	(United States) Baltimore, Maryland	Educational vessel; replica of local 19th century workboats	2 masted gaff	
Lettie G. Howard		1893	(United States) New York City	National Historic Landmark former Essex fishing boat	2 masted gaff	
Lewis R. French	Schooner Lewis R French	1871	(United States) Camden, Maine	National Historic Landmark former cargo boat; oldest surviving sailing vessel built in Maine	2 masted gaff	
Lily		1978	(United States) Stuart, Florida	Tourism/charter vessel. Schooner rig with a scow hull. May have been the last boat purpose built to haul cargo commercially under sail power in the United States. Originally known as Lily of Tisbury.	2 masted gaff	
S.S.S. Lotus		1918	(United States) Webster, New York	Sea Scout Ship; former private yacht	2 masted gaff	
Lynx		2001	(United States) Newport Beach, California	Education/sail training vessel; interpretation of an eponymous 1812 privateer vessel; also see HMS Mosquidobit (1813)	2 masted gaff, square topsail	
Madeline			(United States) Newport, Rhode Island	Tourism vessel	2 masted; gaff fore, Marconi main	
Madawaska Maid		1832	(United States) Phippsburg, Maine	Launched in 1832 at the yard of William Reed she was a 130-ton coaster, 78 feet long with a 23-foot beam	2 masted	
Manitou		1983	(United States) Traverse City, Michigan	Replica of 19th century cargo schooners	2 masted gaff	
Maple Leaf		1904	(Canada) Vancouver, British Columbia	Sail training/ecotourism vessel; former yacht and fishing boat	2 masted, gaff fore and Marconi main	
Margaret Todd		1998	(United States) Bar Harbor, Maine	Tourism vessel; steel hull and deck	4 masted schooner	
Marité		1921	(France)		3 masted gaff, square topsails	
Mary Day		1962	(United States) Camden, Maine	Designed by Havilah Hawkins Sr., built by Harvey Gamage, rebuilt in 2000. Mary Day serves for training and charter.	2 masted gaff topsail schooner	
Mayan		1947	(United States) Santa Cruz, California	Alden Design No. 356-B Centerboard Schooner – a 74-foot wooden schooner designed by John G. Alden and built in Belize	2 masted, gaff foresail	
Mercantile		1916	(United States) Camden, Maine	National Historic Landmark former coastal trader, now tourism vessel	2 masted gaff	
Mystic		2007	(United States) Mystic, Connecticut	Tourism/charter vessel	3 masted gaff, square topsails	
Mystic Whaler		1967	(United States) New London, Connecticut	Tourism/charter vessel	2 masted gaff	
Naga Pelangi		2009	(Germany) Heidelberg, Baden-Württemberg	Tourism/charter vessel	2 masted junk	
Nighthawk		1880	(United States) Baltimore, Maryland		2 masted gaff	
Noorderlicht		1910	(Netherlands) Enkhuizen	Built as German naval lightship, now expedition cruise ship	2 masted gaff	
Olad		1927	(United States) Camden, Maine	Built in 1927 by Crosby Boatyard, now does day sails and charters	2 masted gaff	
Oosterschelde		1918	(Netherlands) Rotterdam	Former freighter, last remaining Dutch vessel of its type	3 masted gaff, square topsails	
Orianda		1937	, United Kingdom	85-foot Bermudian staysail schooner designed by Danish naval architect Oscar W. Dahlstrom.		
Pacific Swift		1986	(Canada) Victoria, British Columbia	Youth sail training vessel	2 masted gaff, square topsail	
Phoenix		1972	(United States) Orcas Island, Washington State	Ferrocement Hull 60' on deck, 90' sparred length, 51 tons, 18' beam, 3,500 Sqr feet of sail.	Gaff-rigged Tops'l schooner.	
HMS Pickle		1995	(United Kingdom) Conwy, Wales	Representation of HMS Pickle (1800), A Baltic Trading Schooner built in Russia as Alevtina Tuy. Used for charters and at the various bicentennial Trafalgar celebrations in the UK.	2 masted, square top-sail	
Pioneer		1885	(United States) New York City	Tourism/museum vessel; former wrought iron-hulled cargo sloop	2 masted gaff	
Pride of Baltimore II		1988	(United States) Baltimore, Maryland	Replica Baltimore Clipper, flagship of Maryland	2 masted gaff, square topsail	
Puritan		1931	, United Kingdom	126-foot gaff rigged schooner designed by naval architect John Alden.	Gaff-rigged	
Quinnipiack		1984	(United States) New Haven, Connecticut	Educational vessel; replica 19th century Gulf Coast freighter	2 masted gaff	
R. Tucker Thompson		1985	(New Zealand) Opua, Bay of Islands	Sail training/tourism vessel	2 masted gaff, square topsails	
Rainbow Warrior (1989)		1957	(Netherlands) Amsterdam	Former commercial trawler, converted and re-launched by Greenpeace in 1989	3 masted gaff	
Rainbow Warrior (2011)		2011	(Netherlands) Amsterdam	Commissioned and launched by Greenpeace in 2011	2 masted Marconi/staysail	
Raja Laut		2006		Luxury charter schooner	2 masted gaff	
La Recouvrance		1993	(France) Brest	Tourism vessel; replica of 1817 Navy boats	2 masted gaff, square topsails	
Regina Maris		1970	(Netherlands) Amsterdam	Charter boat	3 masted gaff	
Roseway		1925	(United States) Camden, Maine	Education/sail training and tourism vessel; former racing/fishing and pilot boat - as of 2022 she is at Mystic Seaport awaiting repairs	2 masted gaff	
Saraswati 2		2014	Nukus	Ultra lightweight racing schooner	2 masted marconi rig	
Sadko		1993	(Spain) Barcelona	Replica in 18th century style	2 masted gaff	
Seaward		1988	(United States) Sausalito, California	Educational non-profit	2 masted stays’l schooner	
Sedna IV		1957	(Canada) Cap-aux-Meules, Quebec	Research/documentary filmmaking/polar exploration vessel; former trawler	3 masted gaff/Marconi mizzen	
Shamrock			(Sweden) Stockholm	Sail training vessel	2 masted gaff	
Shenandoah		1964	(United States) Vineyard Haven, Massachusetts	Tourism/training vessel	2 masted gaff, square topsails; no engine	
Sir Winston Churchill		1966	(Greece)	Privately owned; former sail training vessel	3 masted gaff/Marconi mizzen, square topsails	
Silva of Halifax		1939	(Canada) Halifax, Nova Scotia	Tourism vessel; former cargo carrier	3 masted gaff	
Solway Lass		1902	(Australia) Airlie Beach, Queensland	Charter vessel; former cargo carrier and wartime supply boat	2 masted gaff, square topsails	
The Schooner SoundWaters		1986	(United States) Stamford, CT	Educational vessel owned and operated by SoundWaters	3 masted gaff	
Spirit of Bermuda		2004	Hamilton, Bermuda	Educational vessel owned and operated by the Bermuda Sloop Foundation	3 masted staysail schooner	
Spirit of Dana Point		1983	(United States) Dana Point, California	Educational vessel owned and operated by the Ocean Institute	2 masted topsail	
Spirit of Massachusetts		1984	(United States) Boothbay Harbor, Maine	Education/sail training vessel; modeled after Fredonia	2 masted gaff	
Spirit of South Carolina		2007	(United States) Charleston, South Carolina	Education/sail training vessel	2 masted gaff	
Stephen Taber		1871	(United States) Camden, Maine	National Historic Landmark former cargo boat	2 masted gaff	
Summer Wind		1979	(United States) Baltimore, Maryland	Tourism/charter vessel	2 masted Junk	
Svanen		1916	(Norway) Oslo	Education/sail training vessel	3 masted gaff	
Swift of Ipswich		1938	(United States) Los Angeles	Sail training vessel for at-risk youth; replica of a 1787 schooner	2 masted gaff, square topsails	
SSV Tabor Boy		1914	(United States) Marion, Massachusetts	Sail training vessel, classroom, and floating laboratory of Tabor Academy.	2 masted gaff rigged, topsail schooner.	
Suva	Schooner Suva	1925	Coupeville, Washington	Educational/charter vessel	2 masted staysail	
Tara		1989	(France) Lorient	Polar exploration vessel	2 masted Marconi	
Te Vega		1930	(Italy)	Privately owned; former private yacht, research vessel, and school ship	2 masted gaff	
Thomas E. Lannon		1997	(United States) Gloucester, Massachusetts	Tourism/Private Charter. Built in Essex, MA by Harold Burnham for the Ellis Family	2 masted gaff	
Tole Mour		1988	(United States) Avalon, California	Education/sail training vessel	3 masted gaff, square topsails	
Tradewind		1911	(Netherlands)	Undergoing refit; former fishing/cargo/charter boat	2 masted gaff, square topsails	
Tyrone		1939	(United States)	Tourism/charter vessel	2 masted gaff	
Unforgettable		1979	(United States) Baltimore, Maryland	Tourism/charter vessel	2 masted Marconi/Gaff	
Victory Chimes		1900	(United States) Rockland, Maine	National Historic Landmark	3 masted gaff	
Virginia		2005	(United States) Norfolk, Virginia	Sail training/tourism vessel; replica of a 1916 pilot boat	2 masted gaff knockabout	
Wayward Wind		1972	Suva, Fiji	Tourism/charter vessel	2 masted Marconi/staysail, square topsails	
Western Union		1939	(United States) Key West, Florida	Flagship of Key West	2 masted gaff	
Westward		1961	(United States) Boothbay Harbor, Maine	Education/sail training vessel	2 masted Marconi/staysail, square topsails	
William Bassett		1988	(United States) Onset, Massachusetts	Privately owned		
Windy		1995	(United States) Chicago, Illinois	Public Sailing/Education/sail training vessel. Privately owned	4 masted Schooner	
Winfield Lash		2000	(United States) Friendship, Maine	Privately owned (construction took 18 years)		
Woodwind		1993	(United States) Annapolis, Maryland	Tourism vessel	2 masted staysail	
Woodwind II		1998	(United States) Annapolis, Maryland	Tourism vessel	2 masted staysail	
Xarifa		1927	(United Kingdom) Cowes	Sail cruise vessel	3 masted, Marconi sail	
Yuniy Baltiets		1989	(Russia) Saint Petersburg	Sail training vessel	2 masted; gaff fore, Marconi main	
Zaca a te Moana (schooner)		1992	(Belgium) Antwerp	Pleasure-sailing boat of the Royal Belgian Sailing Club (RBSC)	Fore-and-aft rig	
Zawisza Czarny		1952	(Poland) Gdynia	Sail training vessel	3 masted, square sail	
Zodiac (schooner)		1924	(United States) Seattle, Washington	Sail training/charter vessel; former private yacht and pilot boat	2 masted gaff	

== Historical schooners ==
- A. W. Greely, originally named Donald II
- Ada K. Damon
- Albatross
- USS Alligator (1820)
- Alvin Clark
- America
- American Spirit
- La Amistad
- Annie C. Platt (wrecked 1877)
- Annie Larsen
- Arbuthnot
- Atlantic
- Benjamin C. Cromwell
- Bertha L. Downs
- Bethune Blackwater Schooner
- Bluenose
- Booya
- Texan schooner Brutus, First Texas Navy
- Casuarina
- Chasseur
- Carroll A. Deering
- City of New York (1885 ship)
- Clipper City
- Clotilda, last known slave ship to bring captives from Africa to the United States
- Columbia
- Cora F. Cressey
- Coverack
- USRC Crawford (1830)
- Cymric
- Delawana
- USRC Dexter (1830)
- Diosa del Mar
- USS Dolphin (1821)
- Dorothea Weber
- Dwyn Wen
- Edward M Reed
- Edward J. Lawrence
- Empire Contamar
- USS Enterprise (1799)
- Endymion
- Enterprize
- Equator
- Esperanto
- Fantome
- Forester
- Fort Chesterfield
- USRC Gallatin (1830)
- Gertrude L. Thebaud
- Golden State
- Governor Ames
- USRC Hamilton (1830)
- USS Hannah, first armed American naval vessel
- Happy Harry
- Heimat
- Helen Miller Gould
- Henry Ford
- Henry Roop
- Hesper and Luther Little
- HMS Whiting (1812)
- Hope Haynes
- Ilsley
- Inca (schooner), 5-masted
- Independence
- Independence, First Texas Navy
- USRC Ingham (1832)
- Invincible, First Texas Navy
- USRC Jackson (1832)
- James Postlethwaite
- USRC Jefferson (1832)
- Joffre, shipwreck listed on the American National Register of Historic Places
- Lady Ada
- Liberty First Texas Navy
- Liverpool Packet
- Lucia A. Simpson
- USS Lynx (1814)
- SS Mahratta
- Marie Clarisse ex Archie F. MacKenzie
- Margarethe
- Mary B Mitchell
- USRC McLane (1832)
- USRC Morris (1831)
- O. H. Brown
- Olad
- Paul Palmer, 5-masted
- Phoenix
- HMS Pickle (1800)
- HMS Pictou (1814)
- Postboy
- Pretoria
- Pride of Baltimore
- Reaper
- Rebecca
- Result, in the Ulster Folk and Transport Museum
- Richard Wheeler (wrecked 1877)
- River Witham
- Rouse Simmons
- Royalist
- USRC Rush (1831)
- San Antonio Second Texas Navy
- San Bernard Second Texas Navy
- San Jacinto Second Texas Navy
- St Helena
- Santa Eulàlia (Catalan Pailebot/schooner, 1919)
- Samuel P. Ely
- Speranța, 2-masted gaff, square topsails
- HMS Sultana (1768)
- USRC Taney (1833)
- Tho Pa Ga
- Thomas W. Lawson
- Thomas G. Matteson (New York Pilot Schooner N.Y. 20)
- Tyrronall
- SS Vaitarna
- Virgen de Covadonga
- Wanderer (slave ship)
- USRC Washington (1833)
- Wawona
- Wawaloam
- Westward
- George H. Wetter
- William F. Garms
- USRC Wolcott (1831)
- Wuta
- Wyoming
- USS Yankton (1893)
- Zavala, the first steamship of war in the western hemisphere, Second Texas Navy
- Zawisza Czarny I

== Fictional schooners ==
- Demeter, used by Dracula to travel from Varna to Whitby in Bram Stoker's novel Dracula
- Dragon, in Iain Lawrence's The Smugglers and The Buccaneers, The High Seas Trilogy
- Ebba, Ker Karraje's pirate schooner in Jules Verne's Facing the Flag
- Ghost, seal-hunting schooner in Jack London's The Sea-Wolf
- Hispaniola, a schooner in Robert Louis Stevenson's Treasure Island
- Kestrel, Revolutionary War privateering topsail schooner, Danelle Harmon's Captain of My Heart, My Lady Pirate, and Wicked at Heart
- Lucretia, Cleopatra Highbourne's schooner in Jimmy Buffett's book A Salty Piece of Land
- Prudence & Apostle 1219, in Iain Lawrence's The Smugglers and The Buccaneers, The High Seas Trilogy
- Ringle, a Baltimore clipper, in Patrick O'Brian's The Commodore and subsequent novels in the Aubrey–Maturin series
- Seaspray, a privately owned topsail schooner belonging to journalist Dan Wells in the Roger Mirams 1960's Australian TV series Adventures of the Seaspray
- Sweet Judy, in Terry Pratchett's Nation
- Unnamed Schooner, crewed by Kris Kristofferson's character in the song, Highwayman by The Highwaymen.
- Unnamed Schooner, claimed to belong to Larry David in HBO's Curb Your Enthusiasm
- "We're Here", in Rudyard Kipling's Captains Courageous
- Wild Cat, in Arthur Ransome's Swallows and Amazons stories Peter Duck and Missee Lee

== See also ==
- List of large sailing vessels
