= Helen Gould =

Helen Gould may refer to:

- Helen Miller Shepard (1868–1938), née Gould, American philanthropist
- Helen Beresford, Baroness Decies (1893–1931), American socialite and philanthropist born Helen Vivien Gould
- Helen Margaret Kelly (1884–1952), American socialite, named Gould during her marriage to Frank Jay Gould
- Helen Miller Gould (schooner)
