= Argia (disambiguation) =

Argia or Argea may refer to:

== Entomology ==
- Argia, a genus of damselflies
- Argeia (isopod), a genus of isopod parasites in the family Bopyridae

== Mythology ==
- Argia (mythology), several mythological figures bearing this name

== Other ==
- Argia Sbolenfi, a pseudonym of Italian poet Olindo Guerrini
- Argia (magazine), the oldest magazine published in Basque language
- Argia (schooner), a schooner located in Mystic, Connecticut
- Argea, a village in Ploscuțeni Commune, Vrancea County, Romania
- Argeia (region), a region of ancient Greece
