= Margaret Todd (schooner) =

Four-masted schooner launched in 1998

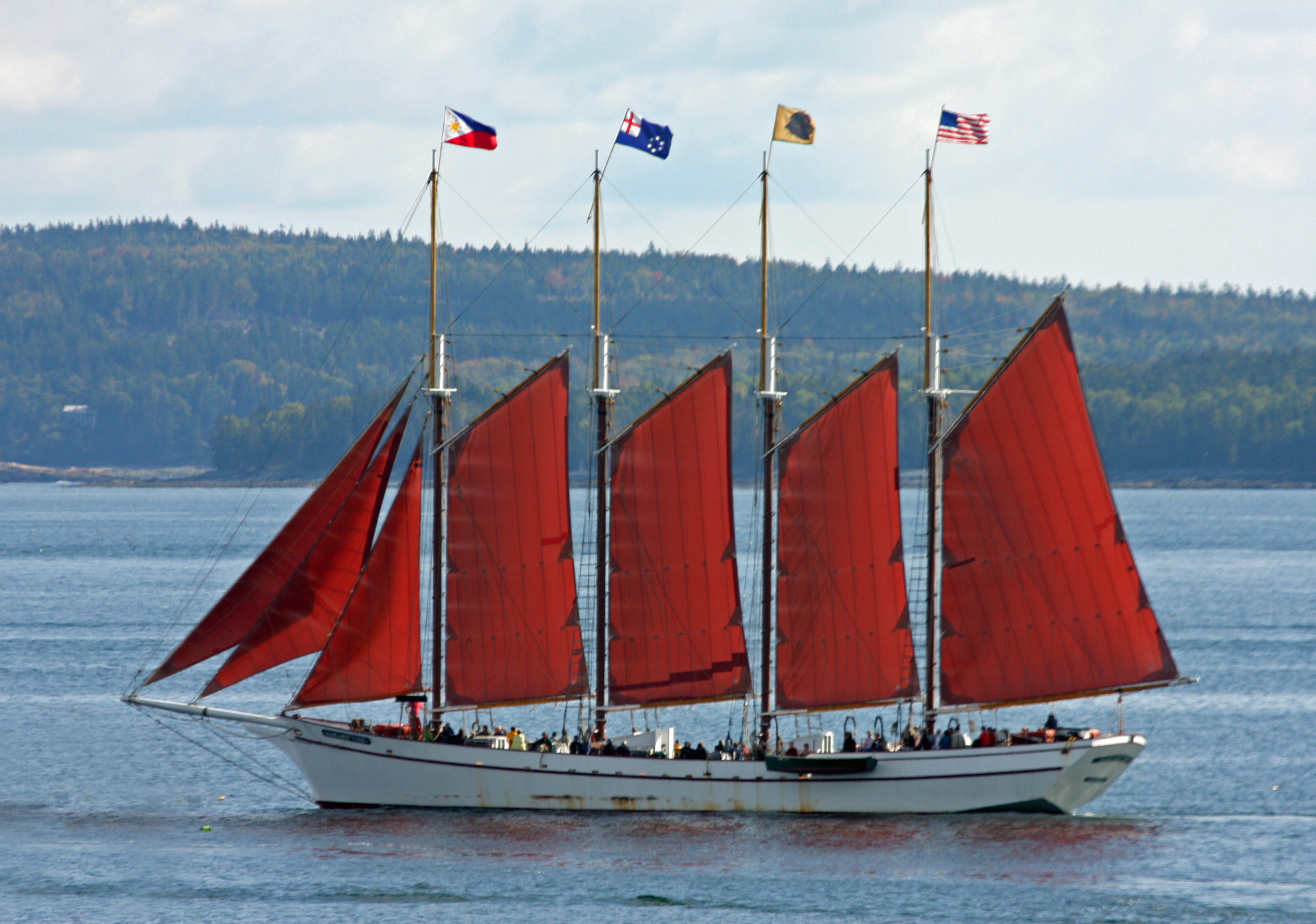
- In Bar Harbor (2009)

History

United States
- Name: Margaret Todd
- Owner: Steven Pagels
- Builder: Schreiber Boatyard, St. Augustine, Florida
- Yard number: 63697
- Launched: April 11, 1998
- Home port: Cherryfield, Maine
- Identification: MMSI number: 367341850; Call sign: WCY3642; USCG Doc. No.: 1058675

General characteristics
- Type: Four-masted schooner
- Displacement: 150 tons
- Length: 151 ft (46 m) overall; 121 ft (37 m) on deck
- Beam: 23 ft (7 m)
- Draft: 5 ft 9 in (1.8 m) (centerboards up); 12 ft (3.7 m) (centerboards down)
- Notes: Sail area is 4,800 sq ft (450 m^{2})

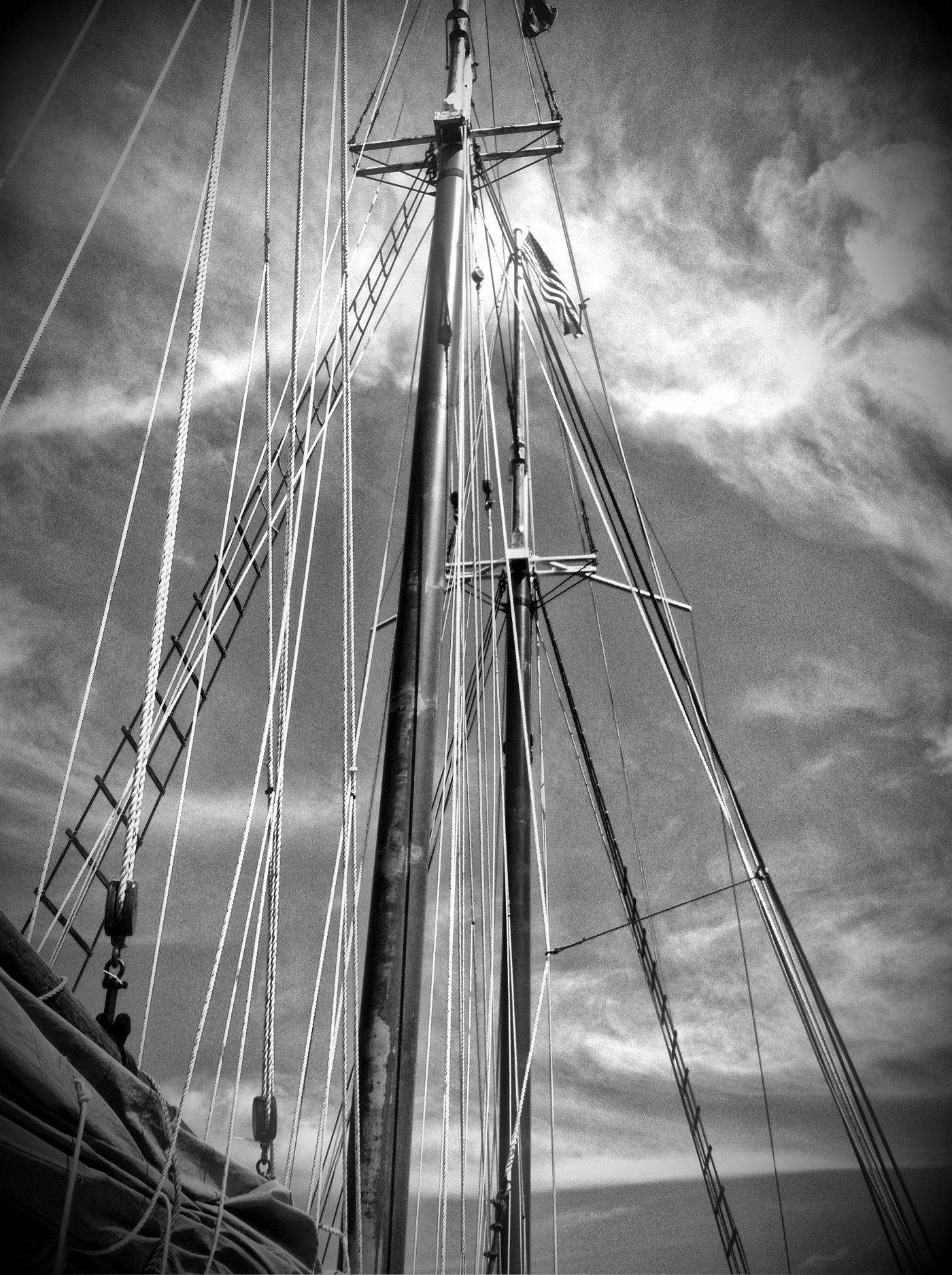
The Margaret Todd in Bar Harbor, Maine.

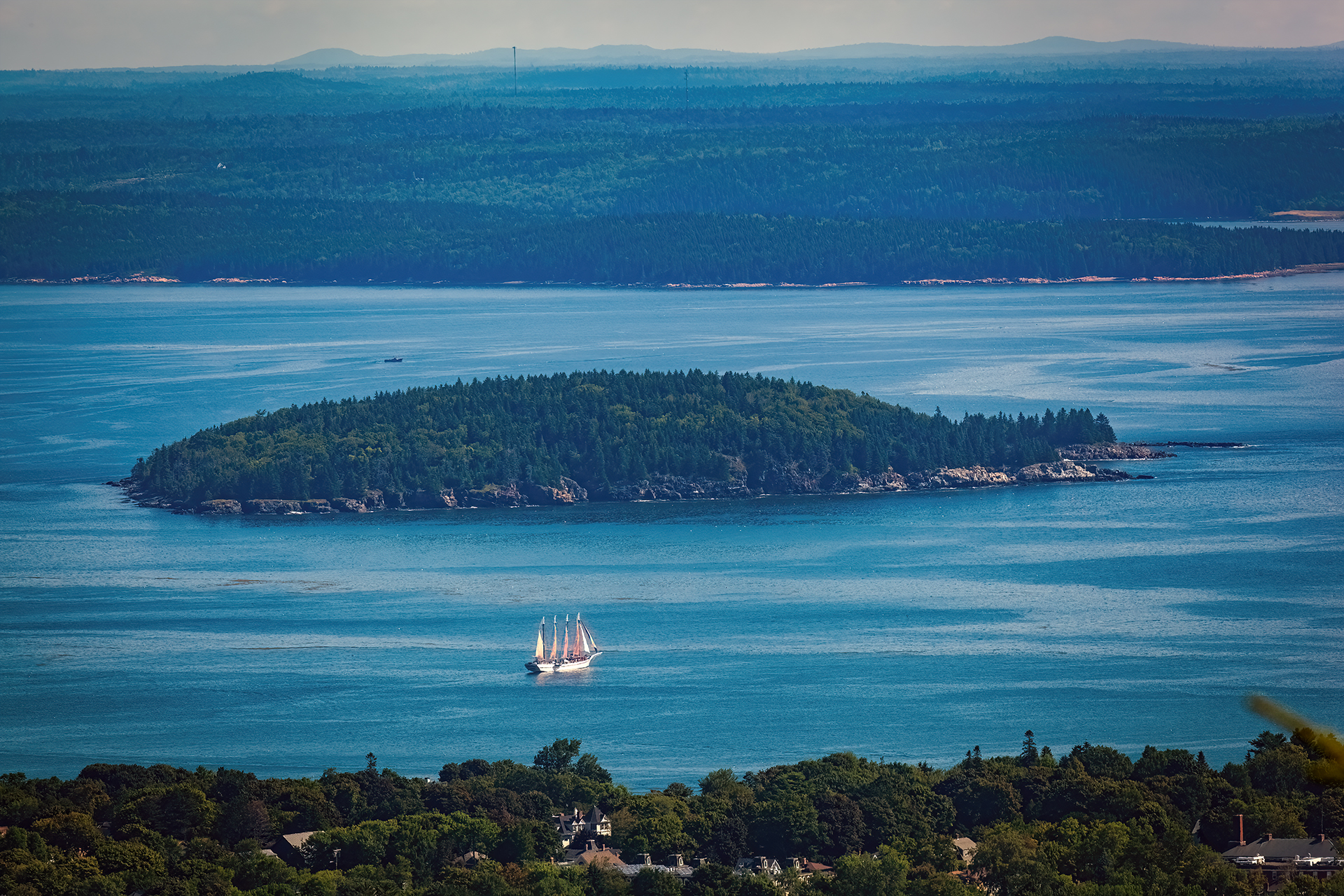
Wide shot of the schooner Margaret Todd in the Mt. Desert Narrows, Bar Harbor, ME. August 2015.

Margaret Todd is a four-masted schooner sailing out of Bar Harbor, Maine, which was launched in 1998. It is operated as a tourist vessel.

== History ==
Margaret Todd was designed by her owner, Steven Pagels, and built by Schreiber Boatyard in St. Augustine, Florida. She was launched on April 11, 1998, and replaced the Natalie Todd (later named American Pride) as a tourist vessel based in Bar Harbor, Maine. While the hull and deck are constructed from steel, the topmasts, gaffs and booms were crafted from Maine spruce. In April 2026, all the spars besides the staysail boom were replaced with aluminum. Most of the schooner's woodwork was done in Maine. The ship's windlass was taken from an oyster schooner. The standing rigging was built by Hamilton Seine Loft.

== See also ==
- List of schooners
