= American Pride =

American Pride may refer to:

- American Pride (schooner), a three-masted schooner built in 1941
- American Pride (ship), a paddlewheel passenger riverboat built-in 2012, formerly known as Queen of the Mississippi
- American Pride (album), by the country music band Alabama
