= Spirit of South Carolina =

Tall ship launched in 2007

History

United States
- Name: Spirit of South Carolina
- Builder: Mark Bayne / Sea Island Shipwrights / South Carolina Maritime Foundation
- Laid down: 16 June 2001
- Launched: 4 March 2007
- Home port: Charleston, South Carolina
- Identification: MMSI number: 367325440; Callsign: WDE2453
- Status: in active service

General characteristics
- Type: Schooner
- Displacement: 150 long tons (152 t)
- Length: 140 ft (43 m) o/a; 90 ft (27 m) on deck; 88 ft (27 m) w/l
- Beam: 24 ft (7 m)
- Draft: 10 ft 4 in (3.15 m)
- Propulsion: 6,462 sq ft (600 m^{2}) sails; 2 × Cummins diesel engines
- Crew: 30 students and crew

Spirit of South Carolina is a "tall ship" built and home ported in Charleston, South Carolina. She was owned and operated by Tommy Baker and Michael Bennett till March 2016, when they donated it to the "Spirit of South Carolina Inc" a 501(c)(3) not for profit foundation. The Spirit of South Carolina is a certificated Sail Training Vessel, providing experiential education programs for the youth of South Carolina. Interdisciplinary programs focus on math, science, history and literature of South Carolina, and our relationship to the water.

Academic focuses include, but are not limited to, Marine Biology, Maritime archaeology, Oceanography, History, Literature, Meteorology and Astronomy. In addition to educational duties, The Spirit of South Carolina serves as an ambassador of the people of South Carolina.

== Frances Elizabeth: Inspiration for Spirit of South Carolina ==
The Spirit of South Carolina is a pilot schooner reminiscent of the Frances Elizabeth, a vessel that was originally built by the Samuel J. Pregnall & Bros. Shipyard in Charleston, SC in 1879 and served pilots in the city's harbor for 25 years.

The pilot schooner Frances Elizabeth was of a hull design very similar to the yacht America, first winner of the America's Cup in 1851. The America was designed according to the specifications of the fastest pilot boat in New York harbor. Pilot boats had to be very fast because the first pilot to reach an incoming ship got the job of bringing the vessel in the harbor, and thus was the only vessel to receive the pilot's fee. Pilot boats had to be seaworthy and able to withstand almost any weather. The pilot schooners serving major shipping ports such as Charleston were exposed to the rigors of the open ocean.

The Frances Elizabeth was licensed as a pilot schooner in 1879 and sank in 1912 in the Cape Fear River near Southport, North Carolina. She had been outfitted with a 'Globe' gasoline engine. A gasoline leak in the bilge resulted in a fire and explosion that destroyed the vessel.

Plans for the Frances Elizabeth were found at the Smithsonian Institution within that organization's extensive collection. Those original plans have been modified and redesigned by Peter Boudreau and Andrew Davis, proprietors of the preeminent tall ship design firm TriCoastal Marine. TriCoastal Marine has been involved with several notable vessels including the Amistad, Spirit of Massachusetts, Lady Maryland, Pride of Baltimore II, Schooner Virginia, and the USS Constellation.

== Building Spirit of South Carolina ==
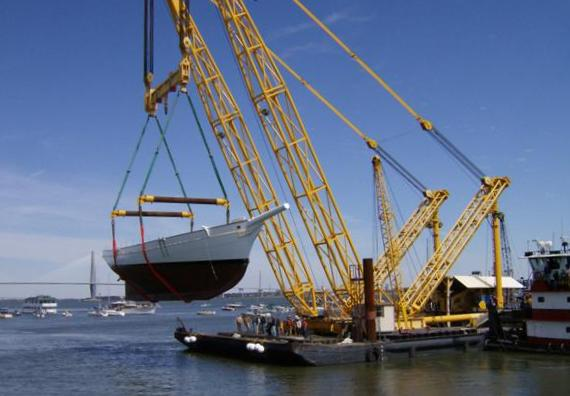
She was launched from Union Pier on the Charleston waterfront on March 4, 2007, at 12:00 Noon.

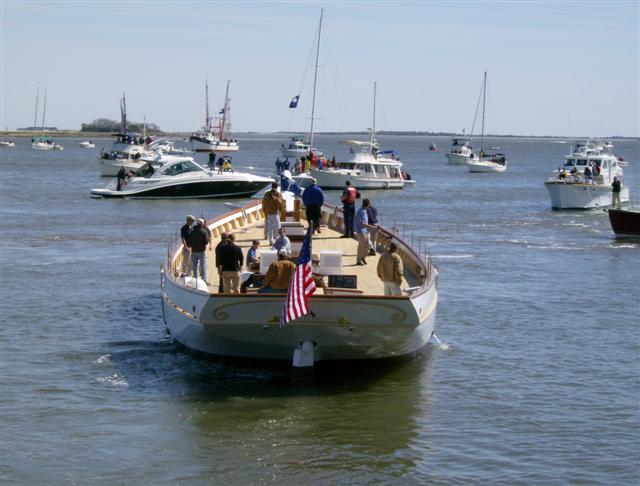
Launch day

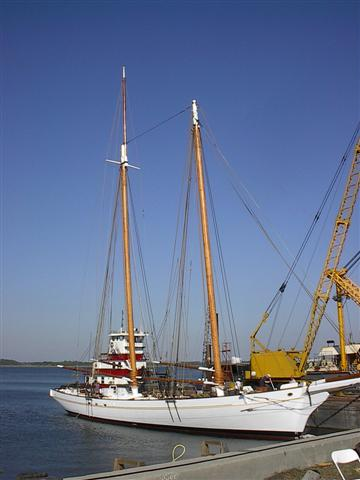
The masts have been stepped and the rig is nearing completion. The Spirit became operational in May 2007.

The Spirit of South Carolina was built by The South Carolina Maritime Foundation, a 501(c)(3) non-profit educational organization founded in August 2000 by Charles S. Sneed to explore and celebrate South Carolina's rich maritime heritage. The Spirit of South Carolina is fully certified as a sailing school vessel by the US Coast Guard. She is capable of carrying 30 students and crew.

Master Shipwright Mark Bayne directed the construction of Spirit of South Carolina. The construction crew consisted of skilled paid shipwrights and volunteers. She is built of several types of woods traditionally used in shipbuilding, including: Live Oak, Angelique, Longleaf Pine, Sapele, Purpleheart, and Douglas Fir. Every element of the vessel was constructed on site, including both masts and all necessary rigging. For safety, she is equipped with two Cummins Diesel engines and carries electronic communications and navigational equipment.

The Sailing School Vessel Spirit of South Carolina is United States Coast Guard certified and operates as a Sailing School Vessel (SSV) under Title 46, Subchapter R of the Code of Federal Regulations (CFR).

The keel was laid June 16, 2001. The Whiskey Plank (last plank to be installed) was fitted on July 15, 2006.

== See also ==
- Sail Training
- Schooner
- List of schooners
