= Tole Mour =

Schooner and salt training vessel

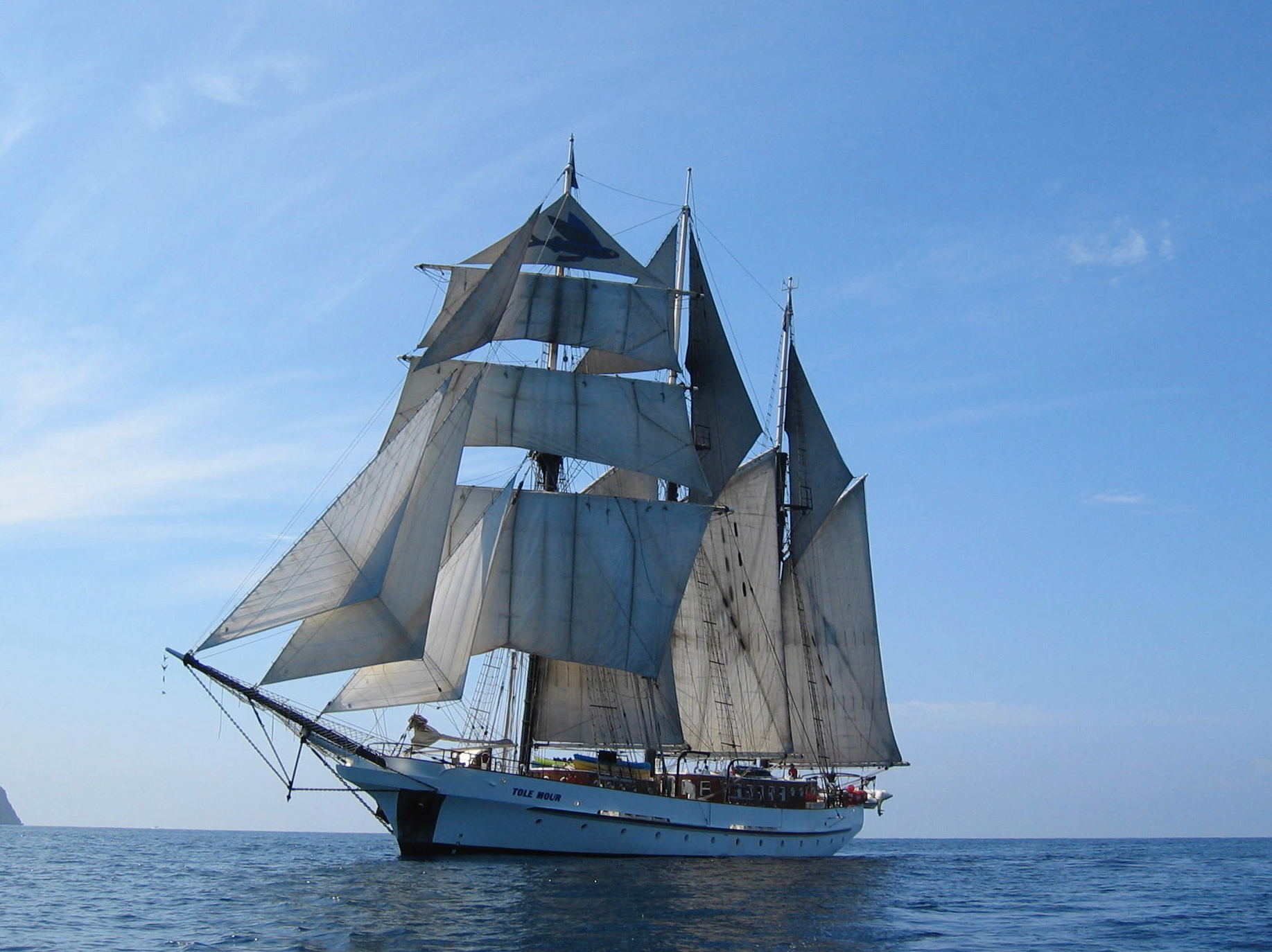
- SSV Tole Mour in 2004

History

Saint Kitts and Nevis
- Name: Vela
- Owner: Island Windjammers
- Builder: Nichols Brothers, Whidbey Island, WA
- Launched: 1988
- Renamed: 2014, formerly Tole Mour (1988–2014)
- Home port: Rodney Bay, Saint Lucia
- Identification: MMSI number: 366822140; Callsign: WDA5625
- Status: Active

General characteristics
- Type: Schooner
- Displacement: 229 tons
- Length: 156 ft (48 m)
- Beam: 31 ft (9 m)
- Height: 13.5 ft (4.1 m)
- Draft: 13 ft 6 in (4 m)
- Sail plan: Sail area: 8,500 sq ft (790 m^{2}). Three masts, 15 sails
- Notes: Design by: Ewbank, Brooke and Associates

Vela, formerly known as SSV Tole Mour, is a 156 ft (48 m) schooner and sail training vessel operating in the Channel Islands of California, off the West Coast of the United States.

Designed by Ewbank, Brooke and Associates, she was built by the Nichols Bros. Boat Builders on Whidbey Island in Washington's Puget Sound to withstand the extreme conditions of the South Pacific, she is extremely seaworthy and meets or exceeds all of the United States Coast Guard's regulations as a sailing school vessel, while offering luxurious accommodations in comparison to other tall ships. At 229 gross registered tons she is the largest active tall ship on the West Coast.

The Tole Mour was originally commissioned by the Marimed Foundation of Hawai’i in 1988 as a self-contained primary health care support vessel, operating in the US trust territory protectorate of the Marshall Islands. The name of the ship was selected by a competition of Marshall Islands school children, and means 'A Gift of Life and Health' in the Marshallese language. With onboard medical, dental and ophthalmological offices, the Tole Mour provided medical services to over 15,000 islanders over a period of 4 years, until the Marshallese government commissioned their own fleet of medical delivery vessels and the Tole Mour returned to Hawai'i to serve other purposes.

In 2001, she was acquired by Guided Discoveries' Catalina Island Marine Institute, offering sail training, oceanography and marine biology education to hundreds of school-aged participants a year. The professional crew was housed in up to 6 double cabins and 2 master rooms within her 123 feet on deck and 31-foot (9 m) beam. Up to 36 youth participants could be accommodated in cabins housing 4, 8 and 10 berths. Her previous medical requirements provided areas for laboratory equipment, touch tanks, and aquariums.

In 2014, the Tole Mour was sold to Island Windjammers, a charter cruise company operating in the Caribbean Sea. She underwent a refitting, as well as a name change, and is now known as Vela.

== See also ==
- List of schooners
