= Orianda =

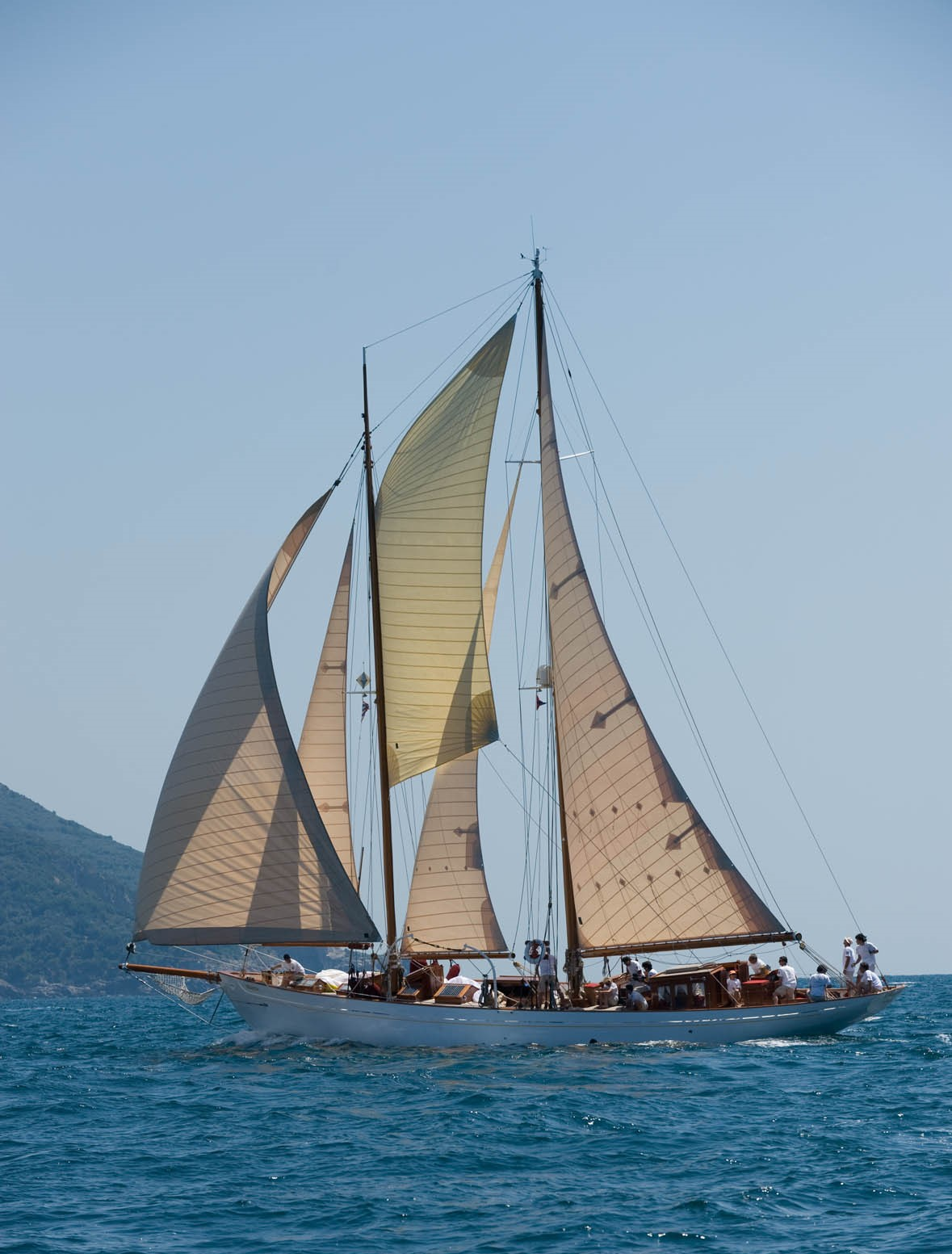
- Orianda sailing in Naples in 2010

History

United Kingdom
- Name: Orianda
- Operator: The Classic Yacht Experience
- Builder: C. Andersen Shipbuilders (Designed by naval architect Oscar W. Dahlstrom)
- Launched: 1937

General characteristics
- Type: Bermuda rig Schooner
- Length: 85 ft (25.9 m)
- Beam: 16.7 ft (5.1 m)
- Draft: 10.5 ft (3.2 m)
- Speed: 9 knots (17 km/h)
- Capacity: 8
- Crew: 3

Orianda (originally named Ragna IV, also previously known as Sabina) is an 85-foot (26 m) Bermudian staysail schooner. It was built in 1937 by C. Andersen, designed by Danish naval architect Oscar W. Dahlstrom. It was used in Denmark during World War II and captured by Germany before being recovered and restored. It is currently used as a charter vessel.

== History ==
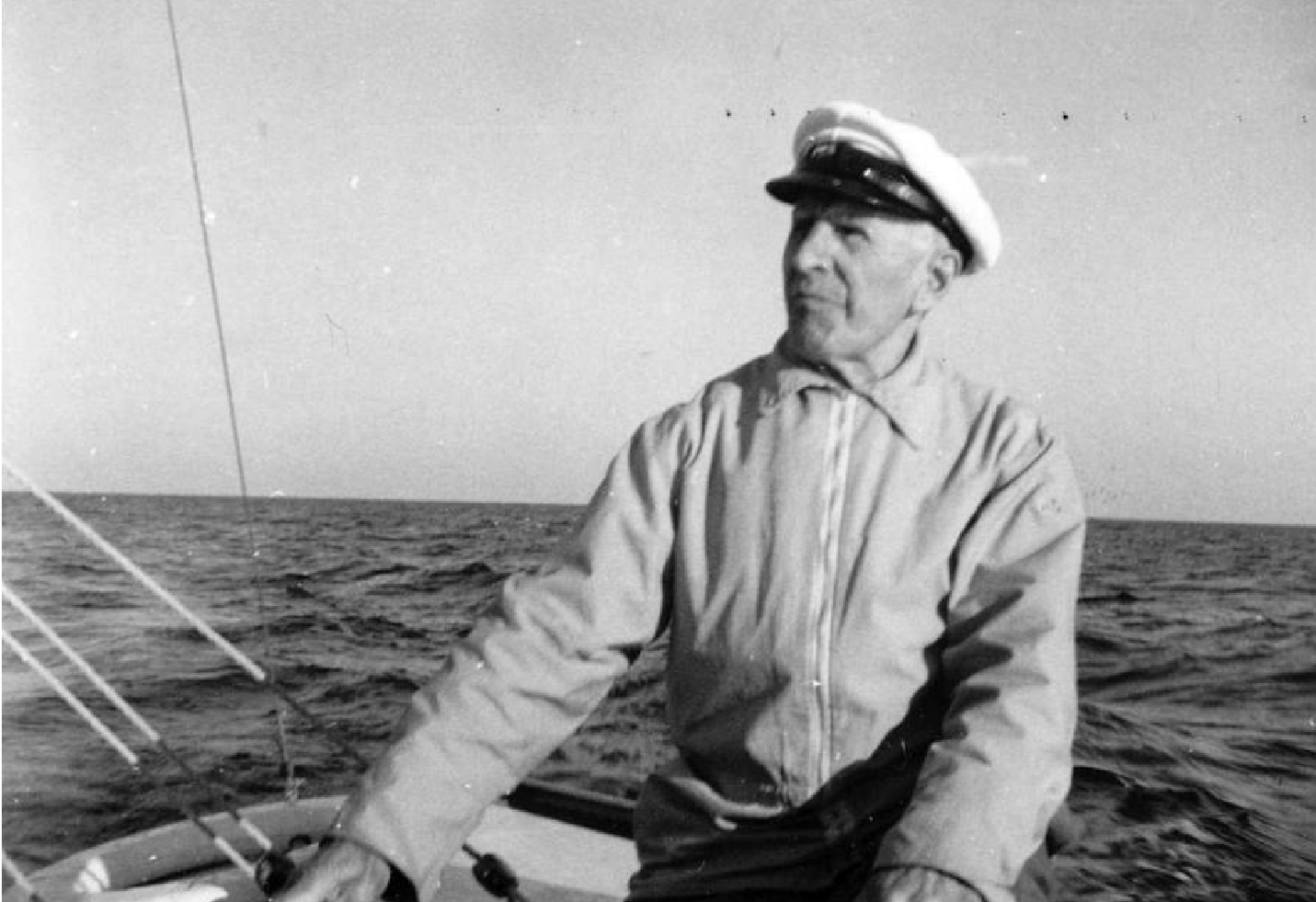
Danish naval architect Oscar W. Dahlstrom

When Orianda was purchased in 2009 from the Benlloch family, the history of its origin was little known and incorrect. For many years, it was believed that Orianda was commissioned by Christian X, the King of Denmark, or by the Duke of Oresund. The new owners traced the history of the ship back to Carl Andersen and a shipyard in Faaborg which no longer existed. After comparing historic documents and photographs from the era, it was determined that Orianda was originally Ragna IV.

Ragna IV was designed by Danish naval architect Oscar W. Dahlstrom. It was originally designed as a racing cruiser in 1937 and was completed by C. Andersen Shipbuilders in Faaborg. The earliest known owner was Ole Sundo according to Lloyd's Register in London in 1939.

The ship was used by Denmark during World War II. It was seized by the Nazi forces during Operation Weserübung and later found abandoned on the shores of Denmark by Baron Johan Otto Raben-Levetzau in 1944. The ship was in disrepair, missing its masts and rigging. Sundo sold it to Baron Raben-Levetzau who restored it at the port of Svendborg.

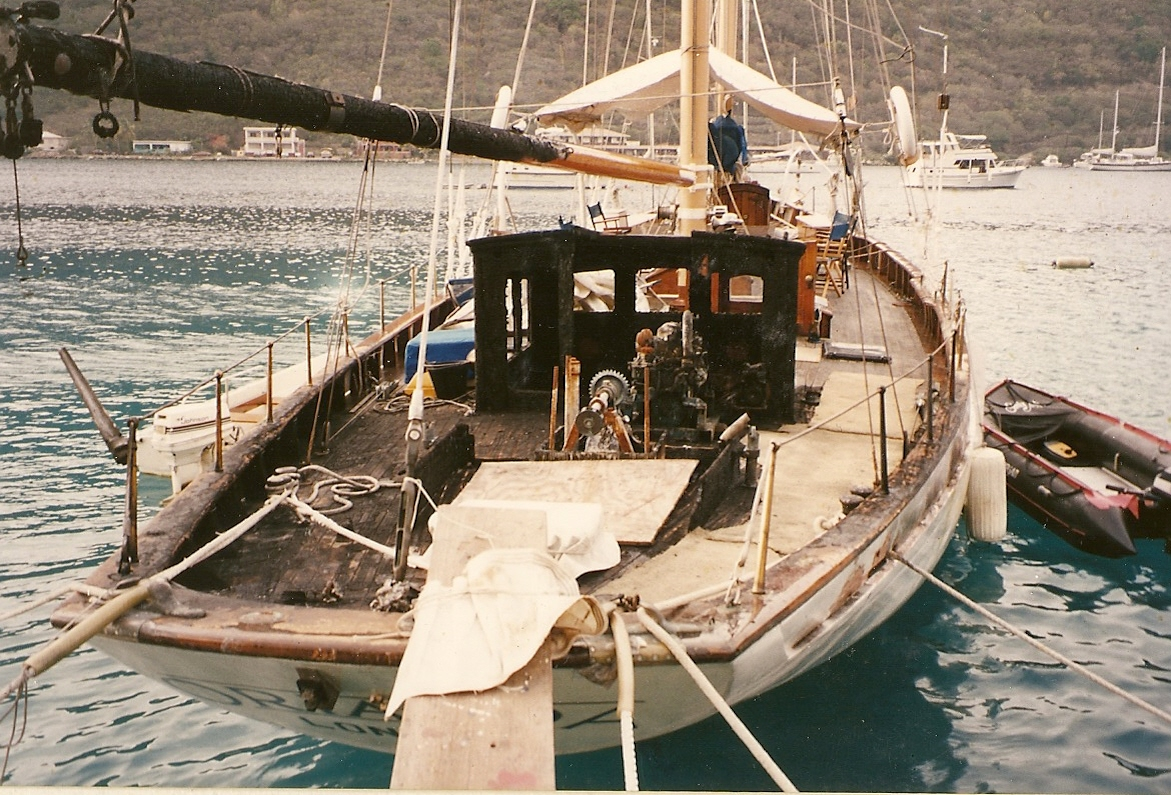
Orianda after the fire in 1987

In 1952, Raben-Levetzau sailed the ship to Sweden where the hull was painted and the ship re-registered under the name Sabina at the Royal Swedish Yachting Club. It was used as a charter in the 1950s until being sold to Stergios C. Souyouldjoglen, the Greek Ambassador to Denmark. It was again sold in 1969, this time to Mr. Draikis of Raleigh Brothers. Ownership changed hands numerous more times under the name Sabina, until it was renamed and registered in Antigua under the name Orianda in 1981. The same year, it was purchased by Neil Peart of the rock band Rush, who wrote about it in his 2011 book Roadshow.

Peter Phillilps purchased Orianda from Peart in 1987. The day after the purchase, the vessel caught fire and damaged most of the boat while anchored in Tortola in the British Virgin Islands. After restoring the boat, Phillips continued to sail it until he sold it to a real estate developer by the name of Benlloch in 1991. The family owned the boat for two decades and even entered it in the Spanish Classic Yacht Regatta in Valencia. The ship was sold in 2009 and completely restored in the Roman shipyard Tecnomar. It is currently operated as a charter boat by The Classic Yacht Experience.

== See also ==
- List of schooners
- Denmark in World War II
