= Empire Sandy =

Tall ship built in 1943

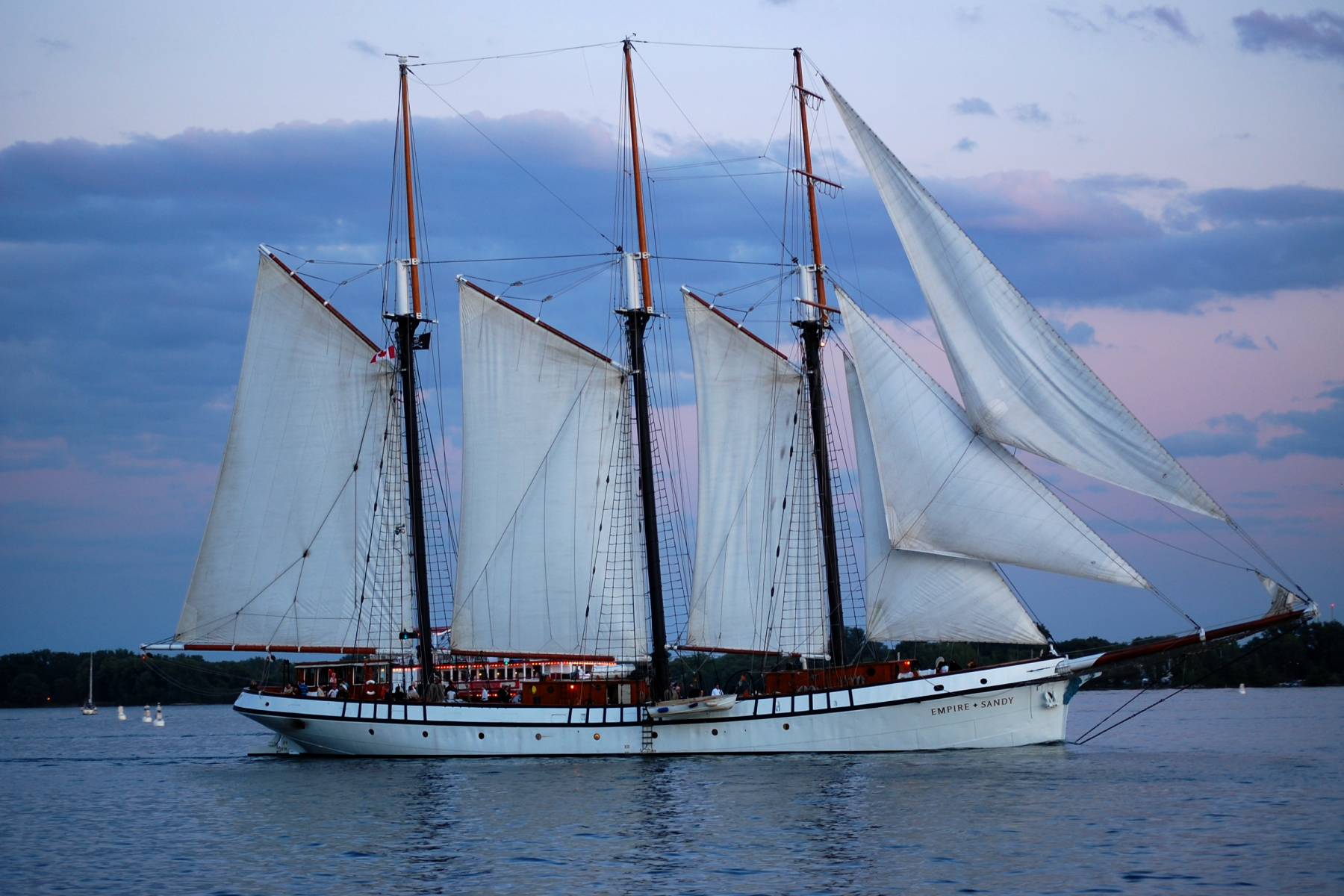
- Empire Sandy

History
- Name: Empire Sandy (1942–48); Ashford (1948–52); Chris M (1953–79); Empire Sandy (since 1979)
- Owner: Ministry of War Transport (1942–45); Admiralty (1945–53); Great Lakes Paper Co (1953–79); Nautical Adventures Ltd (since 1979)
- Operator: Overseas Towage & Salvage Co Ltd (1942–48); Risdon Beasley Ltd (1948–53); Great Lakes Paper Co (1953–79); Nautical Adventures Ltd (since 1979)
- Port of registry: (United Kingdom) Newcastle upon Tyne (1942–48); (United Kingdom) Southampton (1948–53); (Canada) Ft William/Pt Arthur (1953–65); (Canada) Ft William/Pt Arthur (1965–70); (Canada) Thunder Bay (since 1970)
- Builder: Clelands (Successors) Ltd, Willington Quay on Tyne
- Yard number: 66
- Launched: 22 December 1942
- Completed: 14 July 1943
- Maiden voyage: Iceland 30 July 1943
- Reclassified: 1982
- Identification: UK Official Number 169167 (1942–53); Code letters MQTO (1942–48); IMO number: 5071561
- Status: Active

General characteristics
- Class & type: Deep sea tugboat (1942–82); Schooner (since 1982)
- Tonnage: 485 GRT (1942–82); 338 GT (since 1982)
- Displacement: 740 tons (schooner)
- Length: 135 ft (41.15 m) (tug); 203 ft (61.87 m) (schooner)
- Beam: 30 ft 1 in (9.17 m)
- Height: 116 ft (35 m) (schooner)
- Draught: 15 ft 2 in (4.62 m)
- Propulsion: 1 triple expansion steam engine (1942–82); Sails, auxiliary diesel engine (since 1982)
- Sail plan: Schooner (since 1982), Topsail schooner (since 2008)
- Speed: 16 knots (30 km/h) maximum under sail
- Capacity: 275 passengers (since 1982)
- Crew: 25 (since 1982)
- Armament: Anti-aircraft 1943–1945; 2 × bronze cannons (1990)

Empire Sandy is a three-masted schooner providing chartered tall ship tours from Toronto, Canada. She was built in 1943 as an Englishman/Larch Deep Sea-class tugboat for World War II service by the British government. After the end of World War II she was repeatedly sold, renamed Ashford and then Chris M, before being substantially enlarged in a conversion to a schooner and reverting to her original name.

== Tugboat history ==
Empire Sandy was one of 1,464 Empire ships built or acquired for war service by the British government. Built in England in 1943 as a deep sea tugboat, she was tasked with Royal Navy work and salvaging merchant ships damaged in the Battle of the Atlantic and other naval engagements during the Second World War. She served in the North Atlantic Ocean from Iceland to Sierra Leone, the Mediterranean Sea, the Indian Ocean and the Bay of Bengal during the conflict.

Empire Sandy's Second World War 'Official Log-Books' documented all her wartime voyages including the complete particulars of the crew, names, addresses, ages, next of kin etc. The oldest was the Master, E Thomas, 63, and the youngest the Cabin Boy, Kenneth Lewis 15. She met a storm while towing, with rescue tug HM Hesperia, AFD24 (Admiralty Floating Dock No. 24) off the coast of Libya on 8 February 1945. Hesperia and the dock were blown ashore and lost.

In 1948 she was bareboat chartered by Risdon Beazleym who renamed her Ashford. Together with their Bustler-class tug Twyford, Ashford embarked in rescue towing. Ashford is listed as part of the salvage team attending the battleship HMS Warspite after she was driven aground on 23 April 1947 on the way to the breakers. Ashford is incorrectly identified as tug Englishman, however all other particulars are of her.

Ashford was handed back to the Admiralty in 1952. She was then sold to a Canadian firm, the Great Lakes Paper Company, and renamed Chris M (after Chris Michels, a senior employee of Great Lakes Paper). She then came to the Great Lakes where she spent fifteen years towing timber rafts for Lake Superior logging companies. In the early 1970s the aged ship was to be sold to breakers for scrap, but the steel hull was still in very good condition and she was bought by Nautical Adventures Co. for a possible conversion. They completely rebuilt the vessel as a three-masted schooner in the style of the 1880s, and she assumed her original name, Empire Sandy .

On 5 August 2017, Empire Sandy was in collision with the Liberian freighter Ina at Port Colborne, Ontario.

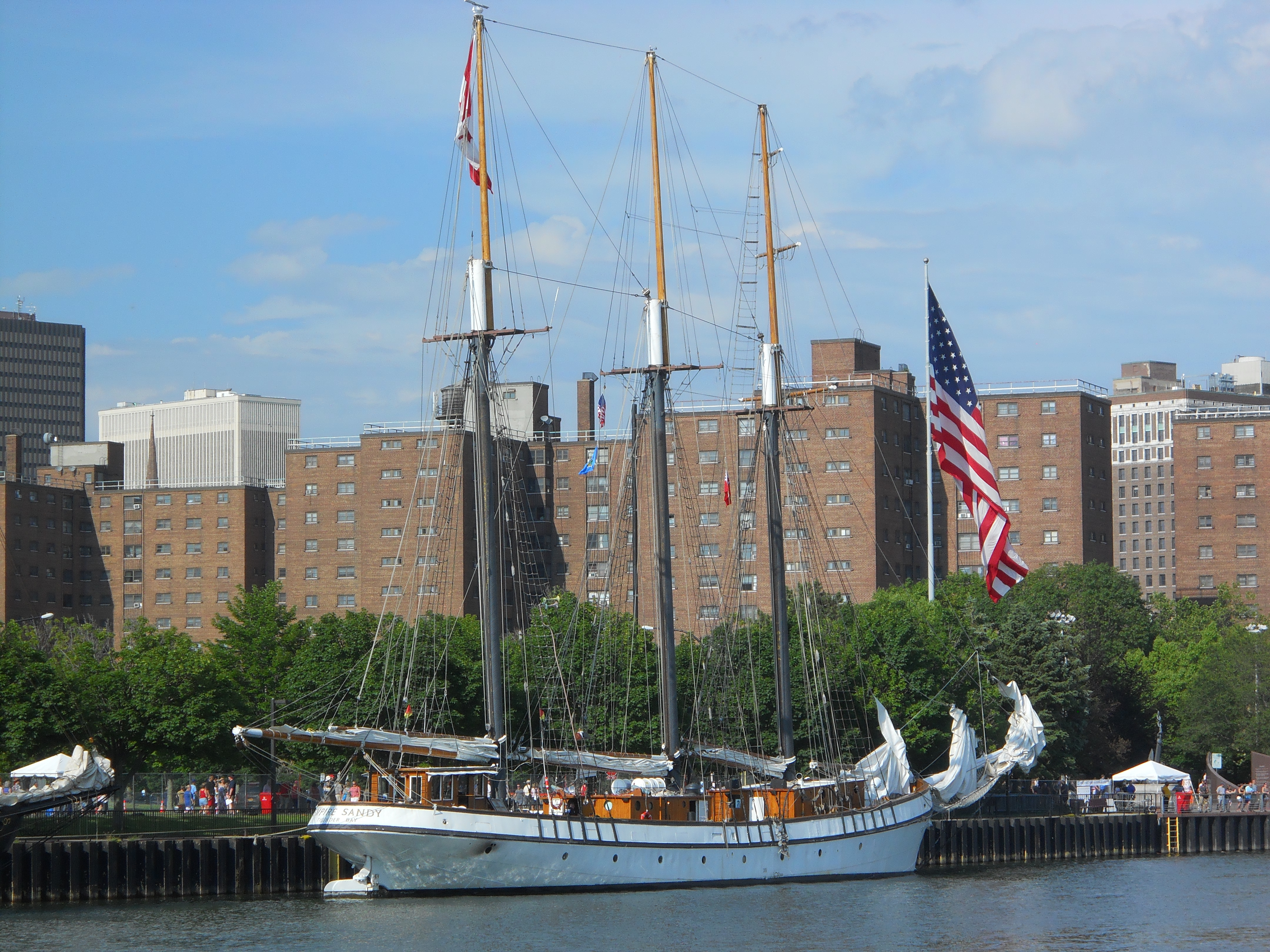
Empire Sandy at the Buffalo, New York, Tall Ships festival on July 4, 2019

== See also ==
- List of schooners
