= Hindu (schooner) =

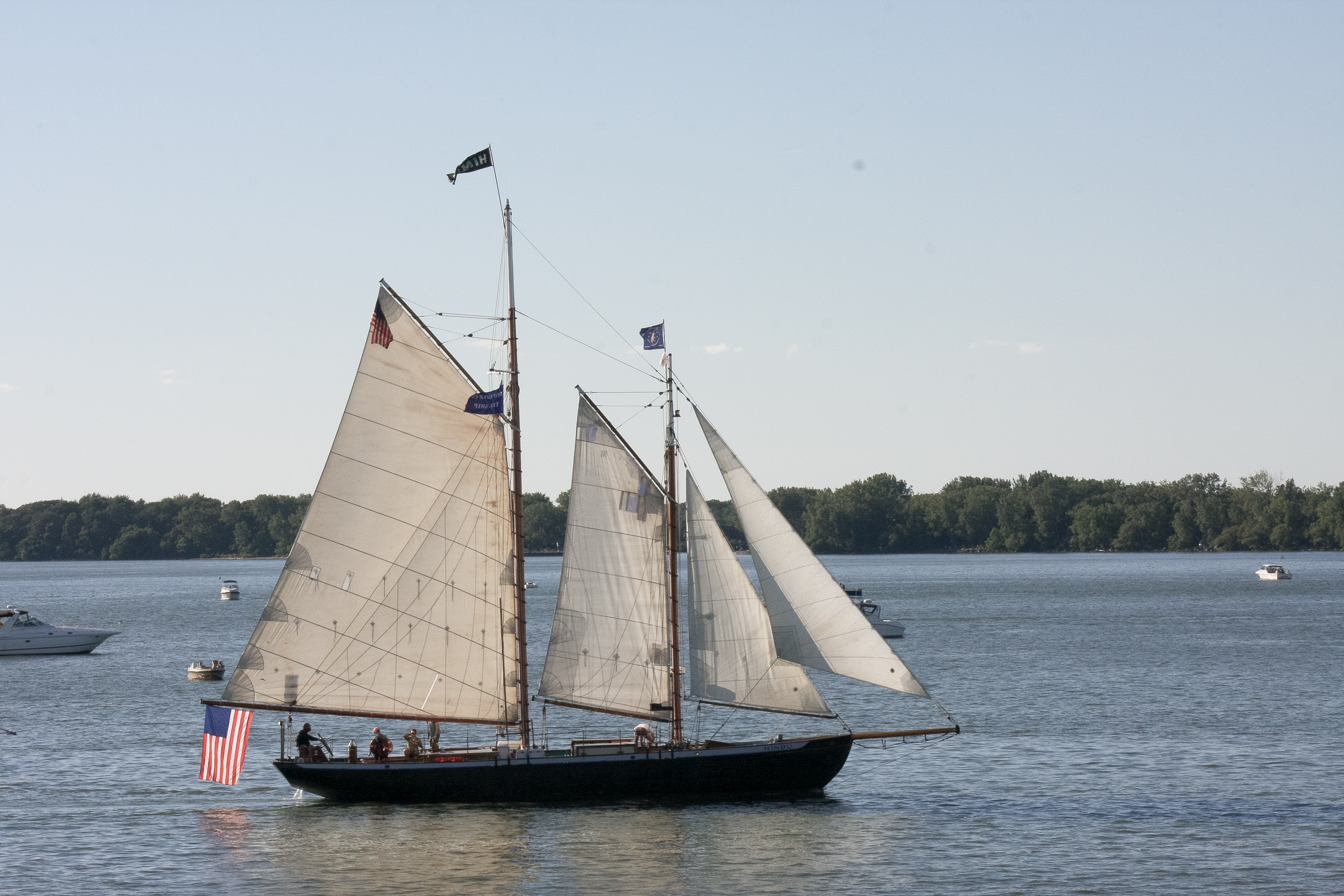
- Hindu on Lake Erie (2013)

History
- Name: Hindu
- Builder: William H. Hand Jr. (designer); Hodgden Brothers East Boothbay, Maine
- Launched: 1925
- Identification: MMSI number: 367554370; Callsign: WDG6190
- Status: Active

General characteristics
- Type: Gaff-rigged schooner
- Tonnage: 29 gross, 21 net
- Displacement: 31 tons
- Length: 79 ft (24 m)
- Beam: 15 ft 9 in (4.80 m)
- Draft: 8 ft 2 in (2.49 m)
- Propulsion: 150-hp 2012 Turbo BMW diesel engine
- Speed: Avg. cruising: 7 kn (13 km/h; 8.1 mph); Max: 12 kn (22 km/h; 14 mph)

The schooner Hindu was constructed by the shipyard Hodgdon Bros. in East Boothbay, Maine in 1925. William H. Hand Jr., a renowned yacht designer, drew the plans for James W. Hall of New York City. The vessel's original name was the Princess Pat," which is a sailor's song of Princess Patricia's Canadian Light Infantry Unit, currently stationed in Edmonton, Alberta. The schooner is a 79-foot (24 m) long overall half-scale model of a 19th-century Grand Banks fishing vessel.

James W. Hall promptly sold the Princess Pat to Alphonsus Reybine, according to title records. After Reybine's death, executor Martha Reynine sold it to T. Sloan Young in 1929. Young changed the name to Saispas, from the French "Je ne sais pas," or "I don’t know." The boat participated in the 1930 Newport-Bermuda Race under Young's ownership. The vessel placed last, sailing alongside such other notable schooners of her era such as the John Alden-designed Malabar X.

Roger W. Randall bought Saispas from Young. Nowell Ames bought her from Randall. Both sales happened in 1935. Nowell changed the boat's name to Anna Lee Ames, before selling her to William A. Parker in 1938. Parker used the boat to trade spices between India and Boston from 1938 to 1940, and christened her Hindu.

The U.S. Navy commissioned Hindu during World War II, where she assisted the Coastal Patrol along the Eastern Seaboard. Log books indicate the navy painted her gray, armed her with depth charges, mounted a machine gun on her deck and engaged a German U-boat on more than one occasion.

Archie A. Comstock owned the boat after the war for a short time before he sold it to Albert "Al" Avellar Jr. and partners in 1946.

Capt. Al Avellar of Provincetown, Massachusetts bought Hindu in 1946 and began sailing her as a passenger vessel there. Avellar eventually pioneered the whale watching industry in 1947 with what is purportedly the first trip on the eastern seaboard. Captain Al Avellar sold the Hindu to Alfred "Al" Bates Tinker Jr. As a young man, Tinker Jr. had been a deckhand aboard the Hindu. Tinker Jr. continued the tradition of sailing the vessel during the summer months, berthed at McMillan Wharf, in Provincetown. Tinker Jr. began a new tradition for the Hindu, when he began providing sailings out of Key West, in the winter season. The boat changed hands a few times in the 1980s before John Bennett became the owner. Bennett died aboard the boat and the schooner fell into disrepair.

Capt. Kevin "Foggy" Foley of Cape Cod and partners bought her in 2006. Then in his late 50s, Foley had sailed aboard Hindu as crew when he was 12 years old. Foley spent a year rebuilding the schooner in East Boothbay. She was used in the production of two Daniel Adams films that take place on Cape Cod: The Golden Boys in 2008 and The Lightkeepers in 2009. Fairwinds Credit Union acquired Hindu in 2009. William Rowan bought the schooner in 2011. The vessel is docked at the Key West Bight Marina, in Old Town Key West.

The schooner spends its year split between Key West, Florida in the winters and Provincetown, Massachusetts in the summers, going on regular day sails and sunset cruises.

== See also ==
- List of schooners
