= Dorothea Weber =

German schooner

History
- Name: Lucy (1922- ); Midgard I; Midgard IV; Elisabeth (-1935); Dorothea Weber (1935-45); Empire Cononley (1945-47); Coverack (1947-53); River Witham (1953-55); Rivergate (1955-59)
- Owner: H J G Weber (1935-45); Ministry of War Transport (1945); Ministry of Transport (1945-47); R Hunt & Son (1947-53); Hull Gates Shipping Co (1953-59)
- Operator: H J G Weber (1935-45); Combern, Longstaff & Co Ltd (1945-47); R Hunt & Son (1947-53); Hull Gates Shipping Co (1953-59)
- Port of registry: (Germany) Hamburg (1935-45); (United Kingdom) London (1945-53); (United Kingdom) Hull (1953-59)
- Builder: J Oelkers
- Launched: 1922
- Out of service: 28 July 1953
- Identification: Code Letters DNMO (1935-45); Code Letters GLKY (1945-59); United Kingdom Official Number 180671 (1945-59)
- Fate: Capsized and sank

General characteristics
- Tonnage: 190 GRT; 100 NRT
- Length: 105 ft 6 in (32.16 m)
- Beam: 24 ft 9 in (7.54 m)
- Depth: 8 ft 1 in (2.46 m)
- Propulsion: Sails (1922-35); Sails + 4SCSA diesel engine (1935-51); Sails + engine (1951-59)
- Sail plan: Barge (1922- ); Schooner (1935-59)

Dorothea Weber was a 190 GRT three-masted schooner that was built in 1922 as the barge Lucy by J Oelkers, Hamburg. She was later renamed Midgard I, Midgard IV and then Elisabeth before a sale in 1935 saw her fitted with a diesel engine and renamed Dorothea Weber. She was seized by the Allies in May 1945 at Guernsey, passed to the Ministry of War Transport (MoWT) and renamed Empire Cononley.

In 1947, she was sold into merchant service and renamed Coverack. A further sale in 1953 saw her renamed River Witham. She served until 1959 when she ran aground off Lowestoft. Although she was refloated, she capsized and sank off the Inner Dowsing Light Vessel.

== Description ==
The ship was built by J Oelkers, Hamburg. She was launched in 1922.

The ship was 105 feet 7 inches (32.18 m) long, with a beam of 24 feet 9 inches (7.54 m) and a depth of 8 feet 1 inch (2.46 m). The ship had a GRT of 190 and a NRT of 100.

As built, the ship was propelled by sails alone. A diesel engine was fitted in 1935 and this was replaced by another engine in 1951.

== History ==
Lucy was built in 1922 as a barge, during the next thirteen years she was renamed Midgard I, Midgard IV and Elisabeth. In 1935, she was bought by H J G Weber, Hamburg. By this time, her sail plan had been changed to a three-masted schooner. She was fitted with a diesel engine. The engine was a six-cylinder, four-stroke single cycle single action engine which had six cylinders of 8 11/16 inches (22.1 cm) diameter by 12 5/8 inches (32 cm) stroke. The engine was built by Linke Hofmann Busch Werke AG, Breslau. Her port of registry was Hamburg and the Code Letters DNMO were allocated.

In May 1945, Dorothea Weber was seized by the Allies at Guernsey and passed to the MoWT. She was placed under the management of Combern, Longstaff & Co Ltd. Her port of registry was changed to London. The Code Letters GLKY and United Kingdom Official Number 180671 were allocated.

In November 1946, Dorothea Weber was offered for sale at £3,500. She had been renamed Empire Cononley by December 1946. She was sold in 1947 to R H Hunt & Son and was renamed Coverack. She was fitted with a new engine in 1951. In 1953, she was sold to the Hull Gate Shipping Co, Hull and was renamed River Witham. On 28 July 1959, she ran aground off Lowestoft, Suffolk. Although she was refloated, she capsized and sank 4 nautical miles (7.4 km) off the Inner Dowsing Light Vessel.
