= Kajama =

Ship

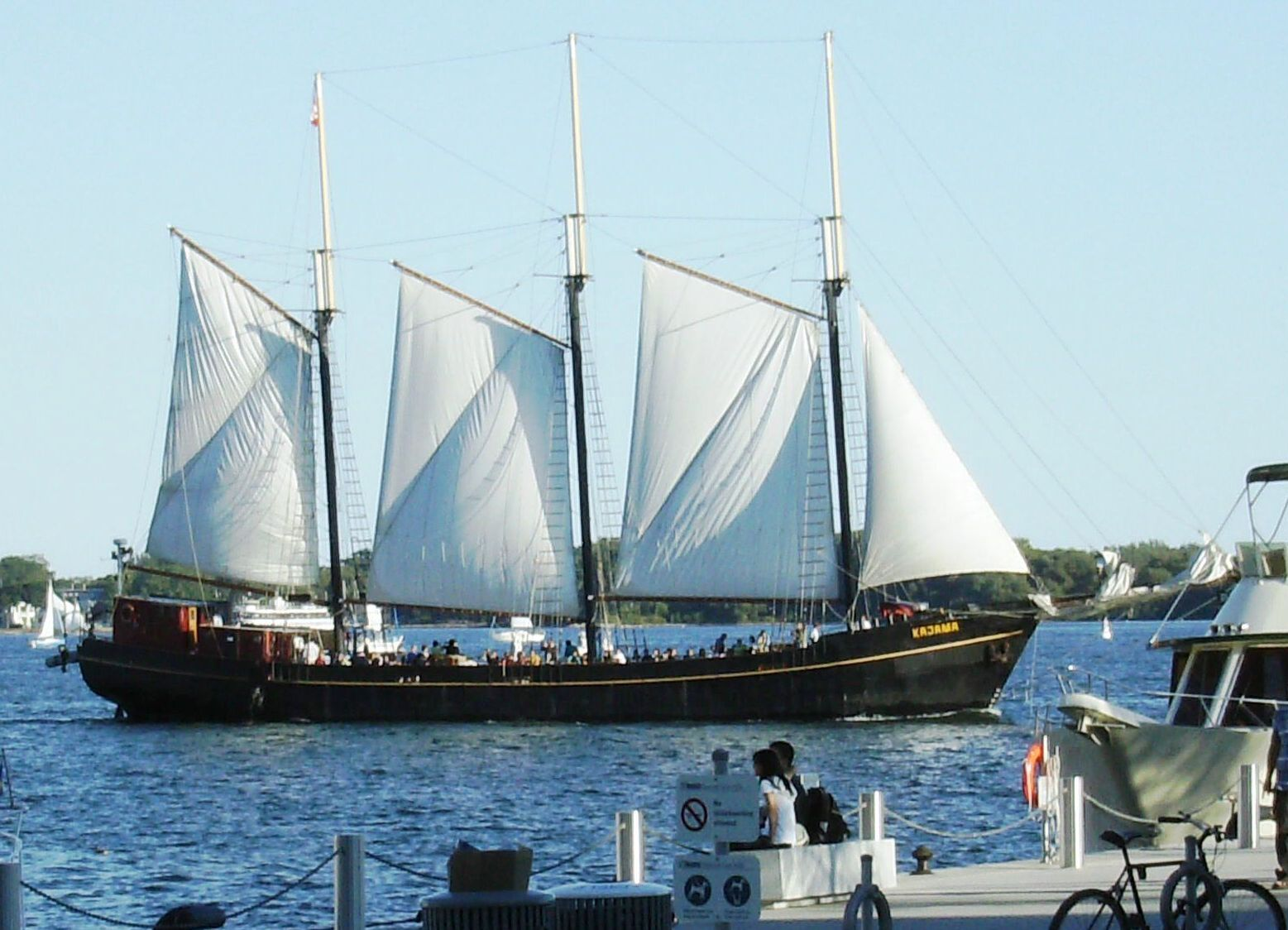
- Kajama in Toronto, 2007

History

Canada
- Name: Wilfried (1930-1960); Kajama (1960-present)
- Operator: Kapt. W. Wilckens, Hamburg (1930-1960); Kapt. A. K. Asmussen, Egernsund (1960-1999); Great Lakes Schooner Co., Toronto (1999-present)
- Port of registry: Toronto
- Builder: Nobiskrug, Rendsburg, Germany
- Launched: 26 July 1930
- Identification: IMO number: 5389578; Call sign: VO7103; MMSI number: 316005305
- Status: in active service, as of 2022

General characteristics
- Type: Cargo schooner
- Tonnage: 263 GT; 174 NT; 447 DWT
- Length: 50 m (164 ft 1 in) o/a
- Beam: 7 m (23 ft 0 in)
- Draft: 2.6 m (8 ft 6 in)
- Depth: 3.6 m (11 ft 10 in)
- Propulsion: 1 × 454 hp (339 kW) Caterpillar C18 diesel engine
- Capacity: 225 passengers

Kajama is a three-masted former cargo schooner, that currently operates on Lake Ontario as a cruise ship.

== Ship history ==
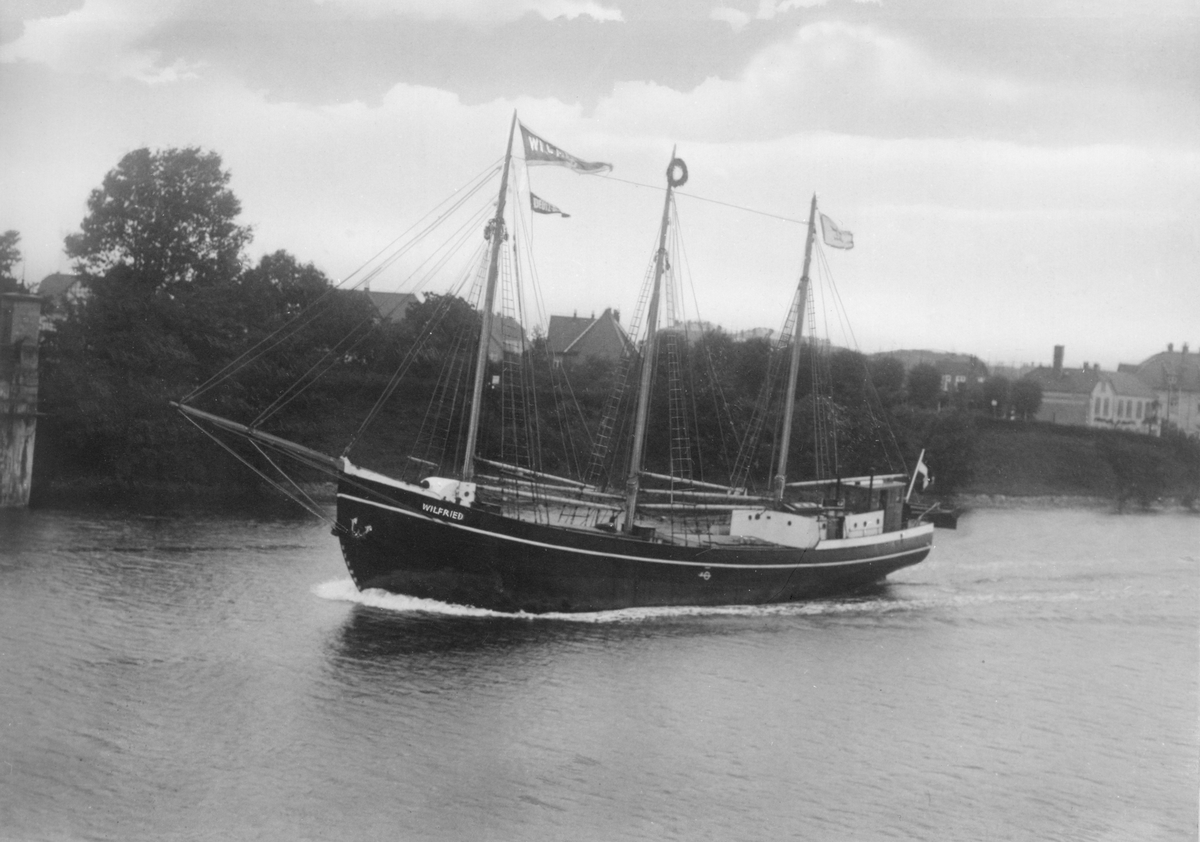
Wilfried in the Kiel Canal

The ship was built at Nobiskrug shipyard in Rendsburg, Germany and launched on July 26, 1930, under the name Wilfried. Captain Wilhelm Wilckens was her owner and master and he operated from the homeport of Hamburg from 1930 until 1960. The Wilfried had 11 sister ships and belonged to the type "Ich verdiene" ("I earn"). In 1960 she was purchased by Captain Andreas Kohler Asmussen of Egersund, Denmark. Asmussen renamed the ship Kajama after his two sons and his wife Kaywe, Jan and Maria.

The ship continued to work under sail until the mid-1970s, at which time the Asmussens converted her to a strictly motor-driven vessel. In the spring of 1998 Captain Asmussen suffered a fatal cardiac arrest while at the helm. As he was the only crew on watch at the time the ship went up on a beach near Malmö, Sweden. Drydocking determined that little damage had been suffered.

Throughout the years from 1930 until 1998 Kajama traded general cargo. Her voyages went as far south as Bilbao in Northwest Spain, throughout western Europe, and Scandinavia, and above the Arctic Circle in Northern Norway.

In January 1999 she was purchased by Great Lakes Schooner Company of Toronto, Ontario, Canada. After preparation for sea she steamed to England, Azores and on to Toronto. Kajama underwent a major overhaul and restoration to her original profile in just over ten months. She is now operating on Lake Ontario, based in Toronto Harbour. The boat is used for public daysails, educational programs and corporate events.

== Gallery ==
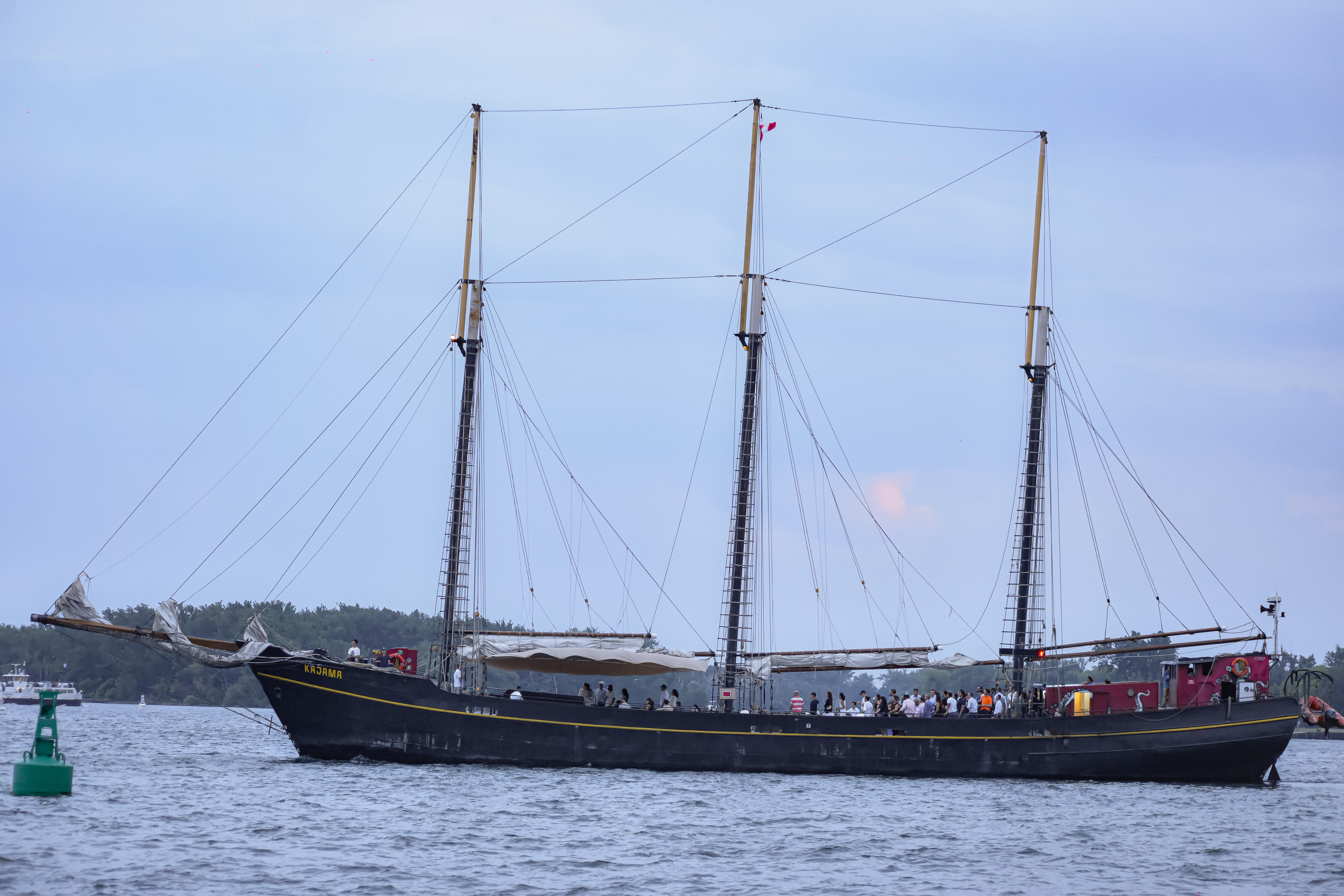
Kajama on Lake Ontario in 2023

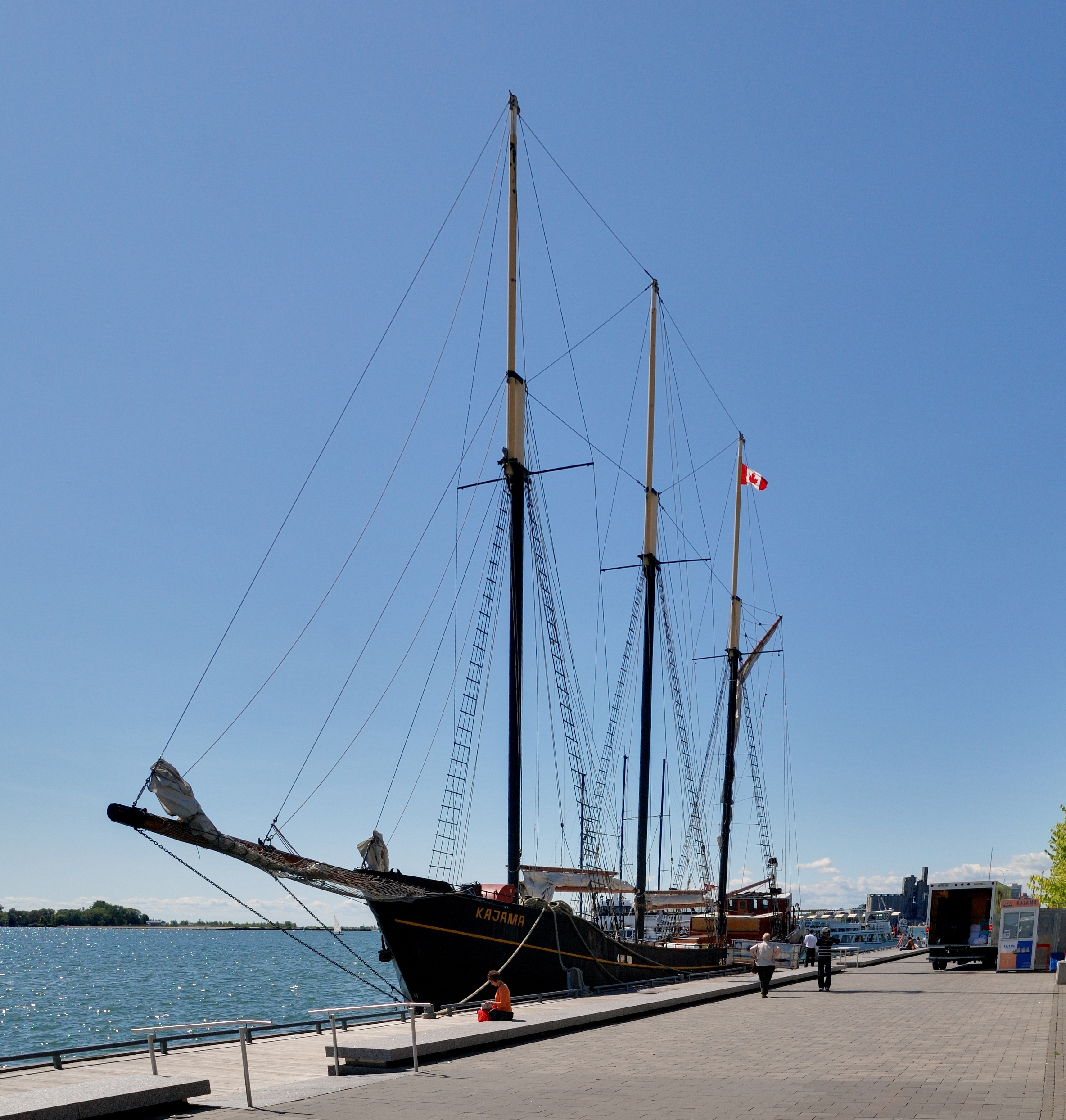
Kajama at Harbourfront, Toronto, 2008

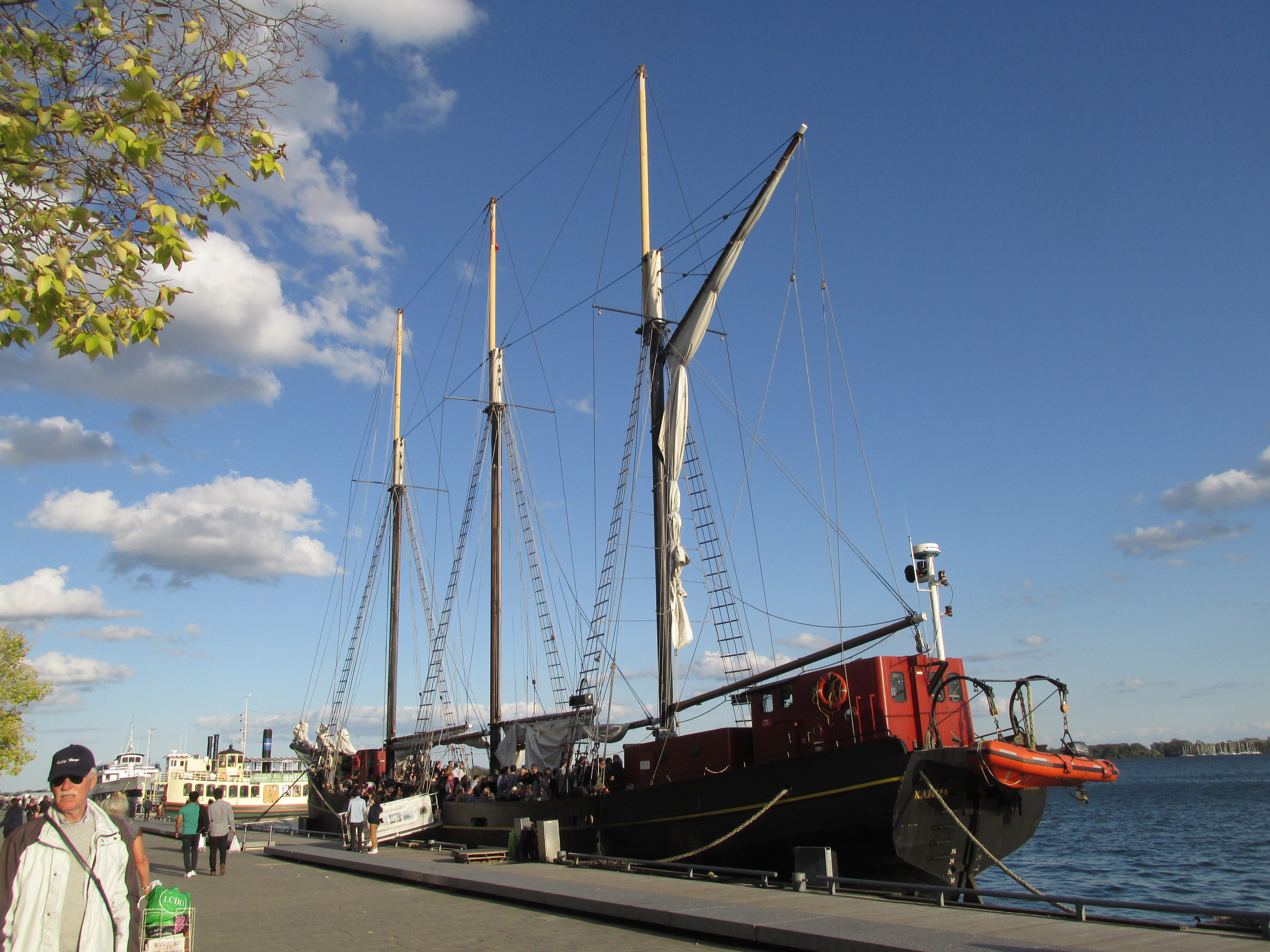
Kajama at Harbourfront, Toronto in 2019
