= American Rover =

History

United States
- Name: American Rover
- Owner: American Marine LLC, Norfolk, VA
- Launched: 1985
- In service: 1986
- Home port: Norfolk, VA
- Identification: MMSI number: 367151570; Callsign: WDD4948
- Status: in service (2015)

General characteristics
- Tonnage: 98 GT
- Length: 78.4 ft (23.9 m) hull; 135 ft (41 m) overall
- Beam: 23.6 ft (7.2 m)
- Depth: 7.3 ft (2.2 m)
- Propulsion: Two diesels, two shafts
- Capacity: 149 passengers, (2015) 129 passengers
- Complement: 3

American Rover is a tall ship that operates public and private passenger harbor cruises from Norfolk, Virginia, United States.

Her steel hull was built in Panama City, Florida in 1985 and she was fitted out in the Willoughby area of Norfolk, Virginia. American Rover measures 98 GT and has a hull length of 78.4 ft (23.9 m) and 135 ft (41 m) overall. Her sail area totals 5,000 square feet, and she has twin auxiliary engines and screws.

When she entered service in 1986, she was the largest three-masted, passenger-carrying topsail schooner in the US. Her design, by Merritt Walter, is based on 19th century cargo schooners of the East coast of the United States and Chesapeake Bay.
