= Bethune Blackwater Schooner =

- U.S. National Register of Historic Places
- Location: Milton, Florida
- NRHP reference No.: 91000948
- Added to NRHP: August 8, 1991

The Bethune Blackwater Schooner is a 19th-century schooner shipwrecked near Milton, in Santa Rosa County, Florida, United States. It is one of Milton's most historically significant sites. It was named after Mr. and Mrs. John Bethune, the site's discoverers and the owners of the property adjacent to the shipwreck, and after the Blackwater River. It is estimated to be about 96 feet long and 93.2 tons. It is one of at least eighteen shipwrecks in or near the Blackwater River. It is located in a slough known as “Morton’s Basin.” Its exact address is unavailable to the public to prevent damage from vandals and sport divers. It is partially exposed underwater and partially covered in sediment. It is well preserved since its partial covering of sediment protects it from erosion and weathering. Approximately ninety percent of the ship is intact, including the entire hull as well as part of the deck and rail. Some features, such as a cabin house, are no longer intact but there are signs of where these features once existed. It is one of the best-preserved examples of its type of schooner discovered so far. It has been studied several times by underwater archaeologists. In February 1988 the Florida Bureau of Archaeological Research declared the vessel to be of significant historical value. On August 8, 1991, it was added to the U.S. National Register of Historic Places.

== Archaeological Investigation ==
The schooner was discovered when Mr. and Mrs. Bethune attempted to build a dock next to their property, a local amateur historian and archaeologist was contacted. The Florida Bureau of Archaeological Research was informed about the wreck and in 1988, the Bureau declared that it was a nineteenth century schooner and that it had significant historical value. In 1988 Dr. Roger C. Smith conducted a video survey of the site to obtain preliminary information. In 1989, David R. Baumer, then a graduate student in the Department of Maritime History and Underwater Research at East Carolina University, and local volunteers thoroughly documented the schooner. The exposed areas of the ship were documented without removing any sediment. Meticulous measurements were made of every aspect of the ship in order to create maps. Various oral and written historical resources were also collected to create a more complete picture. The archaeological work was conducted in order to learn about the design, construction, and use of nineteenth-century schooners and their role in the history of the Gulf Coast. Little is currently known about West Florida's mid-nineteenth century economy, and further investigation of the Bethune Blackwater Schooner could provide valuable information.

== Identification and Possible Role in Commerce ==
From the archaeological documentation, it was concluded that the Bethune Blackwater Schooner was built between the 1830s and 1870s and is a light draft coasting schooner. It has not been positively identified as a specific vessel. Based on various historical documents, such as an 1866 deed for the property mentioning two shipwrecks, it has been suggested that this schooner is The Hornet. However, this has not been confirmed. The Hornet's dimensions were reported to be slightly smaller than those estimated for the Bethune Blackwater Schooner and The Hornet was stated to have sunk in a slightly different location. While the identity of the schooner is uncertain, based on the use of schooners along the Gulf Coast in the mid-nineteenth century, it is probable that this schooner was used to transport lumber to New Orleans and Mobile and materials such as coal to Pensacola. Schooners were frequently used to bring West Floridian lumber to New Orleans. Much of West Florida's economy in the mid-nineteenth century was dependent on maritime trade. West Floridian bricks and lumber would be transported to New Orleans and Mobile or to Cuba and various South American ports. The banks of the Blackwater River housed brick and lumber industries in addition to several shipyards. It is also possible that the schooner was involved in military-related trade, as it is located near a brickyard that supplied the US Army with materials for pre-Civil War fortifications of various ports along the Gulf Coast. Although not directly part of the Blackwater Bethune Schooner site, there is nearby evidence dating to the mid-nineteenth century of former brick and lumber industries, including kilns, bricks, cut lumber, and ballast stones, contributing to the likelihood of the Blackwater Bethune Schooner's involvement in these industries.
