= Lucia A. Simpson =

Wooden schooner

Lucia A. Simpson was a wooden, 3-mast schooner, 127 feet in length, with a 28-foot beam and 8.7 feet depth of hold. The gross tonnage was 227.07 with sail propulsion. The official number is: 140097.

Lucia A. Simpson was built in 1875 by Rand & Burger in Manitowoc, Wisconsin for Simpson & Co. of Milwaukee. Major repairs were done in 1883. Lucia A. Simpson was one of the last full-rigged schooners on the Great Lakes and one of the last still sailing into the 1930s. In May 1929 she was disabled in a squall off Algoma and was towed to Sturgeon Bay for repairs. There is a report that on July 27, 1929, the car ferry Ann Arbor No. 7 sighted the schooner Lucia A. Simpson in distress and towed her to Kewaunee, Wisconsin. In 1934, the Manitowoc Marine Museum considered purchasing her but on Dec. 3, 1935, a fire swept the "graveyard of ships" of the Sturgeon Bay Ship Building Company and destroyed her. There was no loss of life in the 1935 fire.

Owner History
1875-1881 Simpson & Co. of Milwaukee
1882–1899, owned by E.G. Filer, Manistee, Mich.
1900, owned by Henry Durbin, South Milwaukee, Wis.
1900, sold to Hans Simenson of Milwaukee - owner and Captain
1901–1928, owned by Charles J. Sanderson, Milwaukee
1929–30, owned by Northern Marine Corp., Milwaukee
1931–35, owned by Town Harbor Yacht Club of Chicago but was still stored at the Sturgeon Bay Ship Building Co.
