= Ada K. Damon =

Grand Banks schooner

Coordinates: 42.691230°N 70.783005°W

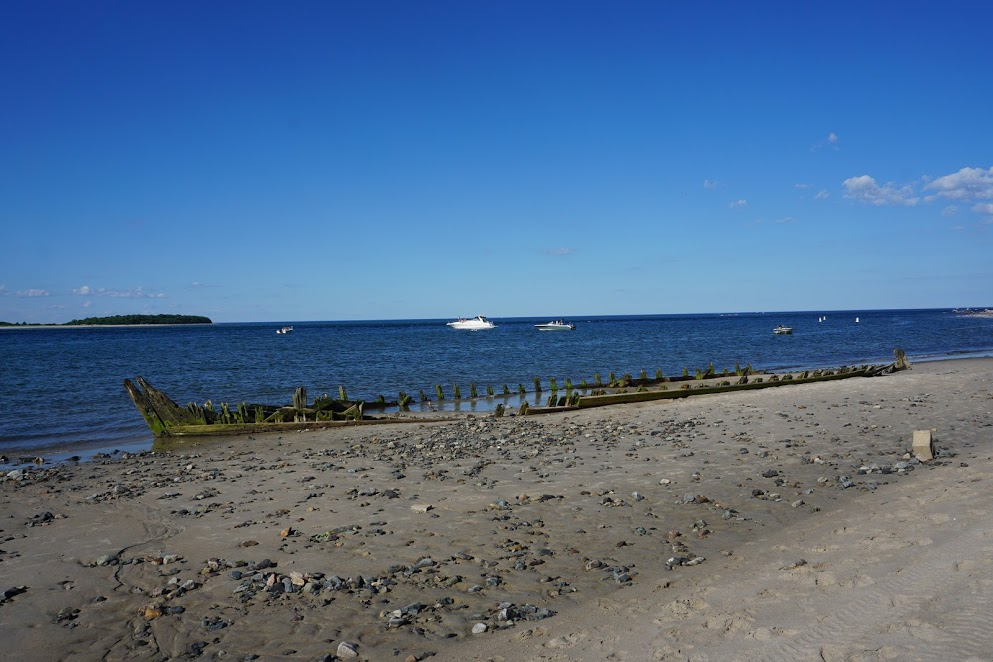
- The wreck of the schooner Ada K. Damon on Crane Beach in Ipswich, MA as it appeared on July 3rd, 2017.

History

United States
- Name: Ada K. Damon
- Owner: A.K. Brewster
- Builder: H.A. Burnham
- Launched: 1875
- Home port: Provincetown, Massachusetts
- Fate: Wrecked December 26, 1909

General characteristics
- Type: Schooner
- Tonnage: 94.22
- Length: 84 ft (26 m)
- Beam: 23.3 ft (7.1 m)
- Depth: 8.2 ft (2.5 m)

Ada K. Damon was a Grand Banks schooner that was used for fishing and later for sand transportation. She was wrecked on 26 December 1909 during a large snowstorm when her anchor chain parted, setting her adrift. Today, the remains of the wreck are a local landmark, a tourist attraction, and an archeological site.

== The ship ==
Ada K. Damon was built in 1875 at H. A. Burnham Boat Building in Essex, Massachusetts. She was 84 ft (26 m) long and had a beam of 23.3 ft (7.1 m) and a depth of 8.2 ft (2.5 m) deep.

== 1893 storm ==
On 20 March 1893, a snow storm caused a dory with eight fishermen aboard to get separated from Ada K. Damon off Highland Light. All eight fishermen died and their bodies washed ashore over the next month.

== Wreck ==
On 26 December 1909, Ada K. Damon′s anchor chain broke, setting her adrift, and she ran aground on Crane Beach in Ipswich, Massachusetts. Her five crew members survived. The United States Life-Saving Service offered to assist in salvaging the ship, but her master, Captain A.K. Brewster, declined, as he wished to sell the ship for scrap. However, on 6 January 1910, he accepted their help in stripping the ship, as he could find no buyer. This included removing the two masts, the bowsprit, and the rigging.

The ship quickly deteriorated, and within a few years the remains were buried in the sand. The wreck partially resurfaced periodically over the next century. The remains resurfaced in 2004, when the beach shifted. They remained half-buried in the intertidal zone of the beach until 2009, when they were once again buried by the shifting sand dunes. The remains partially resurfaced in early 2014, with just the tip of the stem breaking the surface of the sand. In July 2015, the wreck surfaced enough to permit a non-excavation-based archeological survey to document the wreck and confirm its identity as part of a teaching program for Salem State University.

In early 2020 the shifting sands once again exposed the ship down to its keel. In September 2020, Hurricane Teddy hammered the exposed wreck, tearing apart the hull and scattering debris across the beach. In the aftermath of the storm, continued erosion of the beach scattered debris around Ipswich Bay and beyond, leaving little remaining. As of May 2021, only a few beams as well the cast iron galley stove remain on Crane Beach.
