= Henry Roop =

Two-masted wooden schooner built in 1835 in Black Rock, New York

History
- Name: Henry Roop
- Builder: Black Rock, New York
- Launched: 1835
- Fate: Lost in a storm, October 12, 1843, bound for Sandusky, Ohio

General characteristics
- Class & type: Schooner
- Tons burthen: 80 tons
- Length: 65 ft (20 m)
- Beam: 19 ft (5.8 m)
- Draft: 7 ft (2.1 m)

Henry Roop was a two-masted wooden schooner built in 1835 in Black Rock, New York, USA. It was also seen as "H. Roop." The ship measured 65 by 19 by 7 feet and weighed 80 tons. Her last cargo was salt. She was lost in a storm on October 12, 1843, bound for Sandusky, Ohio, USA. There was no loss of life.
