= Argia (schooner) =

Coordinates: 41°21′13″N 71°57′46″W

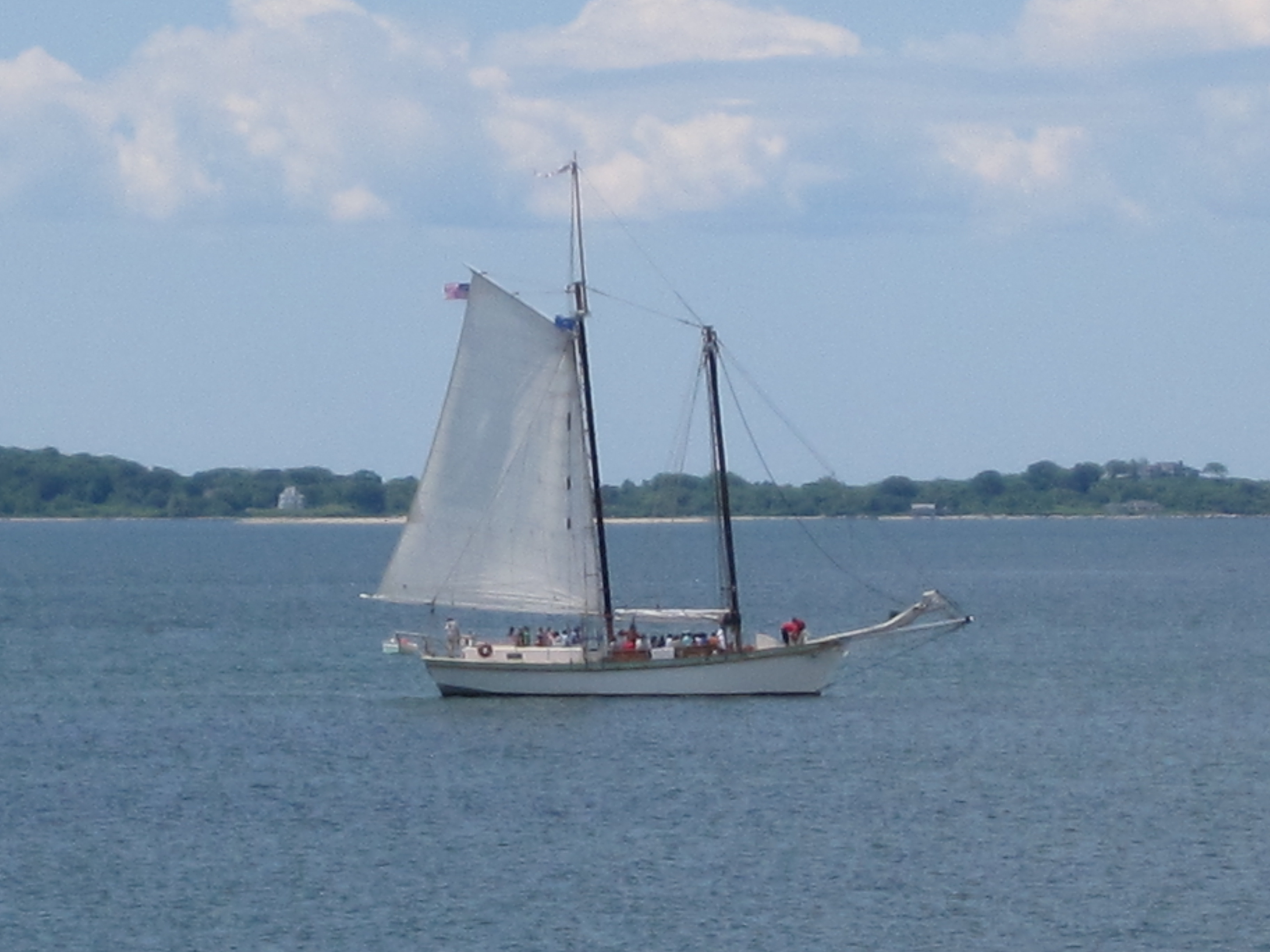
- Argia in 2010

History

United States
- Name: Argia
- Operator: Argia Mystic Cruises
- Builder: Jennings Shipyard, Virginia and Frank Fulchiero
- Launched: 1986
- Fate: Tourism and charter vessel

General characteristics
- Tonnage: 19 Tons
- Length: 81 ft (25 m)
- Beam: 19 ft (5.8 m)
- Height: 78 ft (24 m)
- Draft: 7 ft 6 in (2.29 m)
- Propulsion: 100 hp (75 kW) Diesel
- Sail plan: Gaff Topsail Schooner
- Capacity: 49
- Crew: 5

Argia is a two-masted, gaff topsail schooner. Argia's home port is Mystic, Connecticut, United States. The Argia was built in 1986 to be used as a tourism and charter vessel.

Argia operates during the months of May through October. She is a replica of a 19th-century schooner, designed and built by Captain Frank Fulchiero. Fulchiero named the boat after Argia the water nymph of the Tiber River in Rome. She carries up to 49 passengers on the waters of Fishers Island Sound for two to three hour day sails, charters, and marine science/ coastal ecology programs. The Coastal Ecology Program utilizes various sampling and testing techniques to provide students with a better understanding of marine and coastal ecosystems.

== See also ==
- List of schooners
