= Elizabeth (1914) =

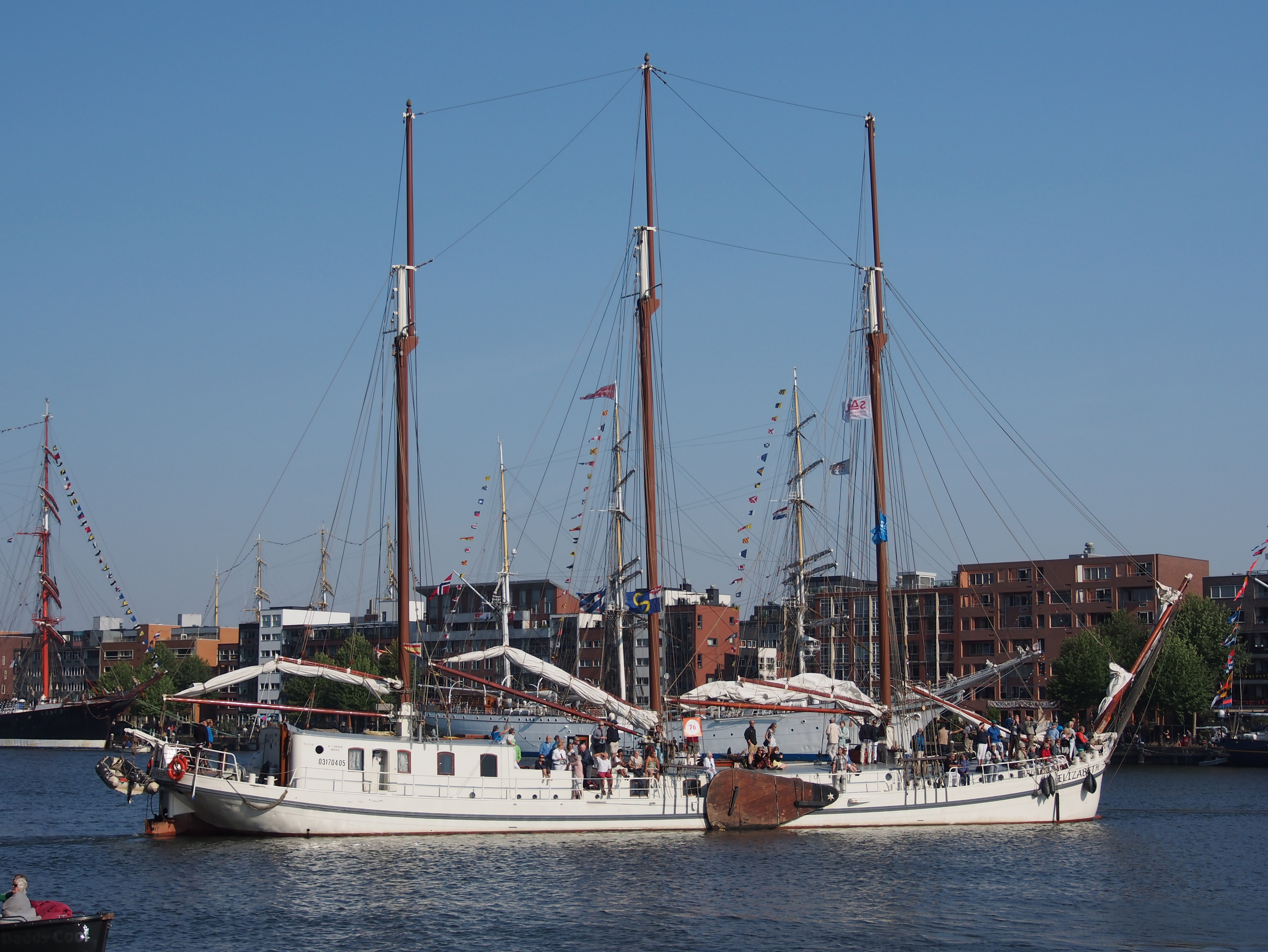
- The ship in Amsterdam

Career
- Builder: De Boer, Rode Vaart (Netherlands)
- Launched: 30 April 1914
- Owner: The Tallship Company
- Homeport: Franeker (Netherlands)
- Status: Active

General characteristics
- Type: Three-masted schooner
- Displacement: 105 t
- Length: 41 m (135 ft)
- Beam: 6.9 m (23 ft)
- Draft: 1.35 m (4.4 ft)
- Propulsion: Gardner diesel engine, 200 hp
- Sail plan: 445 m² (12 sails), height: 32.5 m (107 ft)
- Speed: 10 knots (sail); 8 knots (motor)
- Capacity: 20 to 34 passengers
- Crew: 3

Elizabeth is a Dutch steel-hulled three-masted schooner built between 1913 and 1914.

== Characteristics ==
With a total length of 41 m (134 ft 6 in) and a beam of 6.9 m (22 ft 8 in), the Elizabeth has a draft of 1.45 m (4 ft 9 in).

For propulsion, the ship has a 200-horsepower (150 kW) Gardner auxiliary diesel engine. Its rigging consists of seven gaff sails totaling 445 m^{2} (4,790 sq ft). The cruising speed of the ship is 10 knots (19 km/h; 12 mph) under sail and 8 knots (15 km/h; 9.2 mph) on the engine.

It has a crew of three members for 20 to 34 passengers.

== History ==
At its launch on 30 April 1914, the Elizabeth was equipped with two masts and a flat bottom to navigate in rivers or shallow waters. In the 1930s and then in the 1960s, the ship was equipped with an engine, the masts were removed, and the ship was used as a motor-only cargo vessel until 1990.

In 1990, its new owner, Jan Bruinsma, rigged it as a three-masted schooner to carry out luxury cruises, and its home port became Lemmer. The Tallship Company acquired it in 1991 and based it in Franeker (Netherlands).

== Bibliography ==
- Otmar Schäuffelen (2002). Chapman, Great sailing ships of the world. Translated by Casay Servais. New York: Hearst Books. p. 420. ISBN 1-58816-384-9.
