= Zaca a te Moana (schooner) =

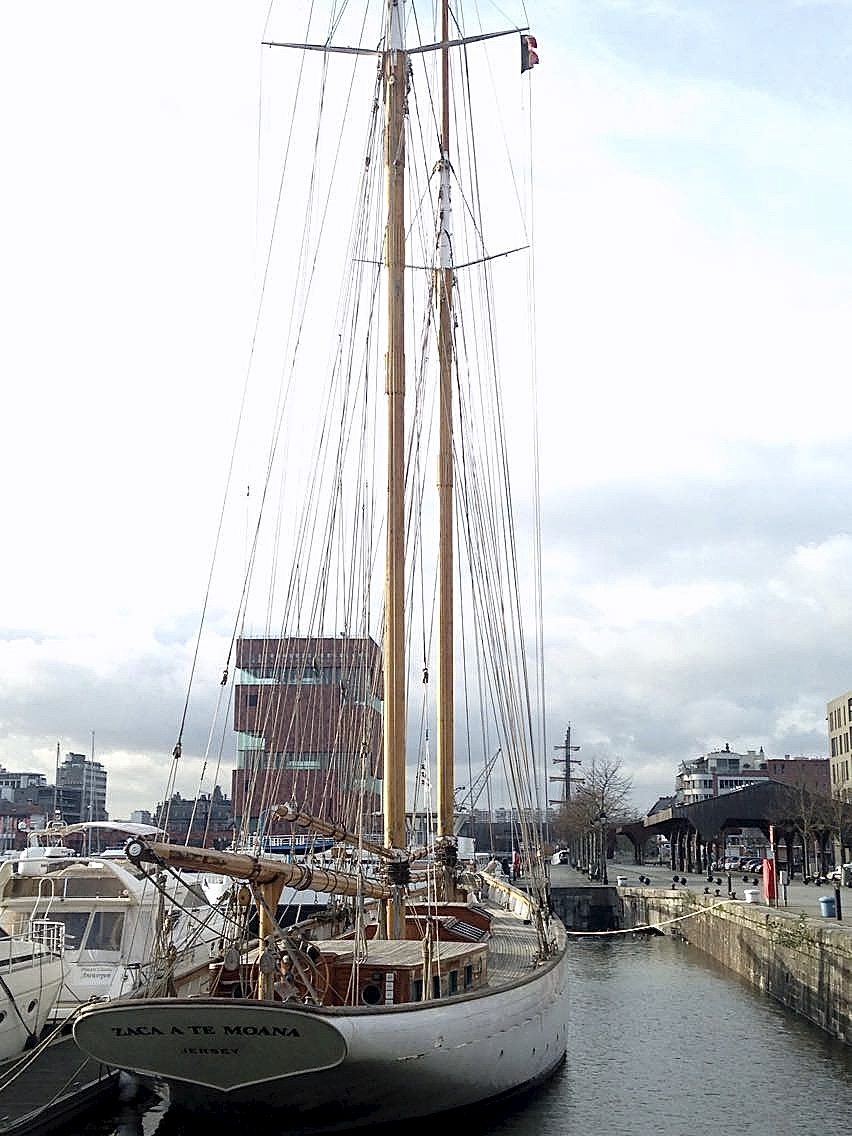
Zaca A Te Moana

The yacht Zaca A Te Moana is a schooner with fore-and-aft rig built in 1992 at Ouderkerk aan de Amstel, in Netherlands. The naval architect is Olivier Van Meer, and the interior architect is Ed Kastelein.

== Dimensions ==
The overall length is 43,8 meters, 7,2 meters of width and 4,3 meters for the draught. It has got sails surface of 815m², her cruise speed is 8 knots and her maximal speed is 11 knots.

Her tonnage is 175 tons because of her steel hull that offer a solid and sturdy structure, the deck and the superstructure are in teak. This sailing ship has a Rolls-Royce motor with 6 cylinders of 220Kw(300 horses power) working with Marine diesel.

== The Zaca concept ==
The architecture of the yacht is based on the sailing ship Zaca, this is the property of the actor Errol Flynn, built in 1930. It was registered at Jersey and Saint-Hélier is her home port. This ship was restored, during the 90's years and today it does some parade in the port of Monaco in mediterranean. Zaca A Te Moana is the little brother with her age, but is more bigger in size.

== Ship activities ==
This yacht is a luxury boat which can have as a guest 12 persons on board additional to the 8 crew members. After sailing in the Caribbeans, it was moored in 2015 at Zeebruges, in the pleasure-sailing port of the Royal Belgian Sailing Club (RBSC).

Until 2015 this yacht sailed regularly in the Caribbean where it participated at the St.Martin Classic Regatta and in Mediterranean too, with 4 fix crew members and 4 occasional crew members. At the time, the ship should leave to Antwerp to be restored at the 138 quay : only the cabin, the masts ad the riggings with stay from the origin, the remaining parts shall be reorganized to bring more space and comfort on board. Since this time, it has been moored in the pleasure-sailing port at Antwerp.
