= Helen Miller Gould (schooner) =

American fishing schooner (1900–1901)

History

United States
- Name: Helen Miller Gould
- Builder: Captain G. Melvin McClain & John Bishop, Gloucester, Massachusetts
- Cost: $22,000
- Launched: March 29, 1900
- Fate: Destroyed by fire October 25, 1901

General characteristics
- Tonnage: 149
- Height: Main mast: 80 ft (24 m)
- Propulsion: Sails until 1900 when equipped with an engine
- Speed: 8 knots (15 km/h; 9.2 mph)
- Notes: Main boom: 70 ft (21 m); Main gaff: 42 ft (13 m); Bowsprit: 28 ft (8.5 m) (outboard)

Helen Miller Gould was a short-lived mackerel fishing schooner. As the first large schooner fitted with an auxiliary engine, she was representative of the shift from sail to engine power.

== Early years ==
She was designed by Captain G. Melvin McClain of Rockport, Massachusetts, who also designed the Effie M. Morrissey. She was built by John Bishop, during the winter of 1899–1900 at the Vincent Cove yard in Gloucester, Massachusetts. She was launched on March 29, 1900, before a crowd of more than 3,000 people. Captain Jacobs was on board during the launch, along with Captain G. Melvin McClain, a few other captains, and Captain Jacobs' daughter who broke the wine bottle to christen the ship.

Later in 1900, the owners installed a 35 horse power Globe engine to supplement the sails. Subsequently, they installed a larger, 150 horse power engine, which increased her speed to 8 knots. With the larger engine she began her true mackerel fishing career, with Jacobs as captain.

== Brief fishing career ==
The Helen Miller Gould survived only a year after her launch, but in that year, set and broke mackerel fishing records. The 150 horse power engine showed Captain Jacobs that auxiliary power enabled faster trips, which led to bigger profits.

The month after launch, and two weeks after heading to sea on April 12, 1900, she arrived in New York with over 200 barrels of fresh mackerel, which sold for nine or ten cents a pound.

The success continued. On September 3, she returned to Gloucester, Massachusetts with 720 barrels of mackerel, which broke all records. In that year she stocked $40,660, at a share of $863.

== Sudden end ==
On October 25, 1901—seventeen months after her launch—she caught fire at North Sydney, Nova Scotia from a leak in the gasoline apparatus and burned to the waterline. The threat of an explosion prevented the kind of fire-fighting efforts that might have saved her. The crew escaped with their lives, but lost all their personal belongings.
