= American Pride (schooner) =

Three-masted schooner built in 1941

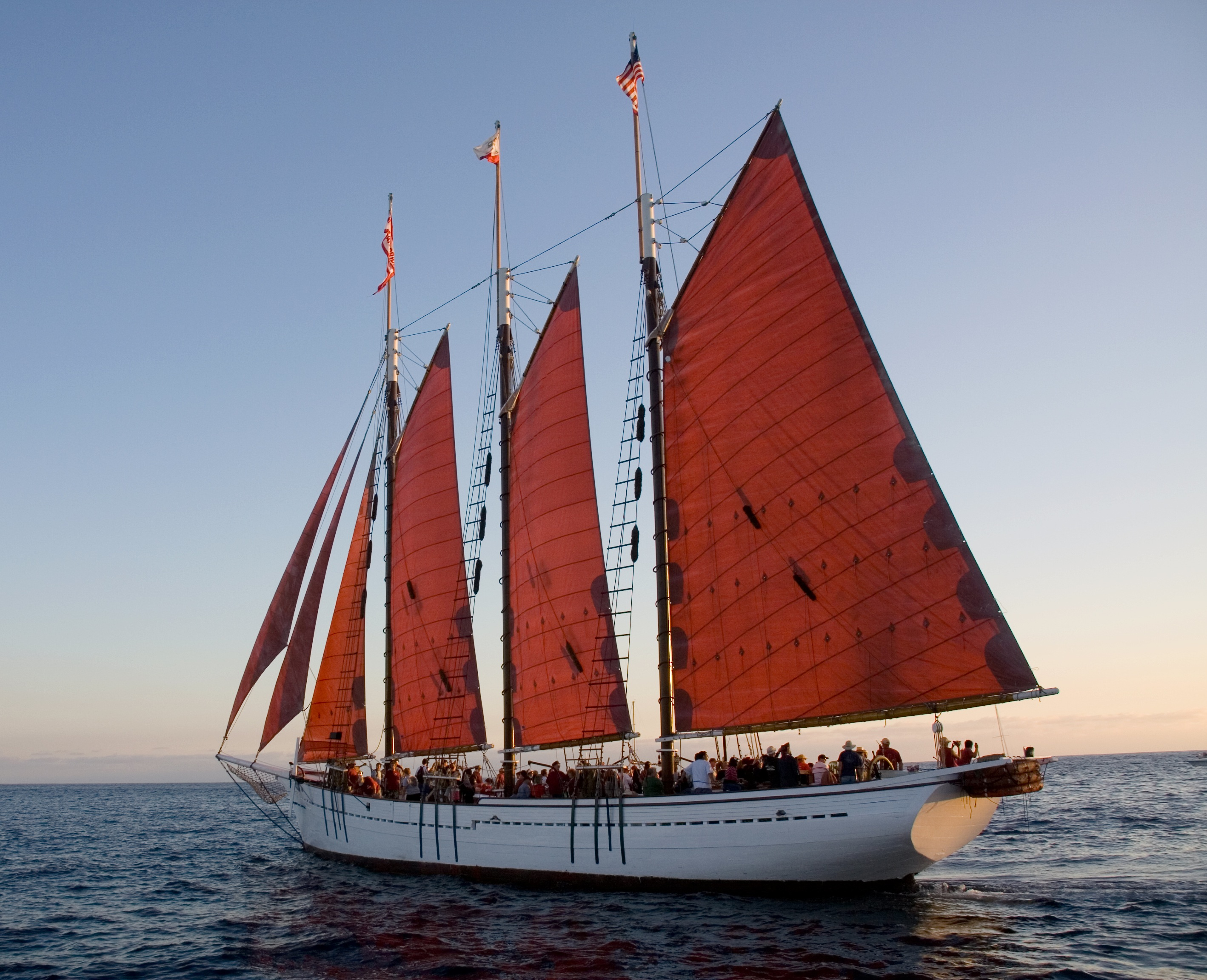
- The American Pride at the Dana Point Tall Ships Festival

History

United States
- Name: American Pride
- Builder: Muller Boatworks, Brooklyn, New York
- Launched: 1941
- Home port: Long Beach, California
- Identification: IMO number: 7202786

General characteristics
- Type: Three-masted schooner
- Displacement: 200 tons
- Length: 130 ft (40 m) overall; 101 ft (31 m) on deck
- Beam: 22 ft (7 m)
- Draft: 10 ft (3.0 m)
- Capacity: 100
- Notes: Sail area is 4,900 sq ft (460 m^{2})

American Pride is a three-masted schooner built in 1941 by Muller Boatworks in Brooklyn, New York. It was administrated by the Children's Maritime Foundation (CMF), her home port is Long Beach, California. She is easily recognized by her bright ochre sails.

== History ==
American Pride was originally built as a two-masted "schooner-dragger" known as Virginia and spent over 40 years as a commercial fishing vessel, operating in the Grand Banks and George's Bank. Following a complete restoration in 1986, where she acquired her third mast, she was renamed Natalie Todd and operated as a charter boat out of Bar Harbor, Maine.

In October 1996, she was purchased by the American Heritage Maritime Institute (AHMI) and sailed to California via the Panama Canal. The administrating foundation name was changed to the Children's Maritime Foundation, a not-for-profit organization.

American Pride was formally gifted to the Giving Center (a nationwide 501(c)3 not for profit charitable organization) in April 2017. The Giving Center is an education based charity based out of Nevada. The ship was recently impounded by the City of Long Beach.

In August 2018, the City of Long Beach transferred ownership to the Los Angeles Maritime Institute (LAMI).

== Mission ==
American Pride was used for marine science education, sail training, and living history programs.

American Pride is certified to carry 100 passengers and 6 crew for day sails and 59 passengers overnight, although she has only 38 bunks (32 passengers, 5 crew, 1 captain).

== See also ==
- List of schooners
- Inherent Vice (film)
- Hell's Kitchen (U.S. season 14)
