= List of ship launches in 1833 =

The list of ship launches in 1833 provide a chronological record of some ships launched in that year.

Date	Ship	Class	Builder	Location	Country	Notes
8 January	Parkfield	Full-rigged ship	Bath	Douglas	Isle of Man	For private owner.
8 January	Tapley	East Indiaman	Thomas Royden & Co	Liverpool	United Kingdom	For private owner.
21 January	Lord Stormont	Snow	G. Frater	Sunderland	United Kingdom	For Noble & partners.
22 January	Faithful	Merchantman	Jabez Bayley	Ipswich	United Kingdom	For private owner.
26 January	Penyard Park	East Indiaman	Hunt	Gloucester	United Kingdom	For John Usborne.
January	Charles Eaton	Barque	William Smoult Temple	Coringa	India	For private owner.
5 February	Asia	East Indiaman	H. Smith	Gainsborough	United Kingdom	For Messrs. John Beadl & Co and Messrs. Holderness & Chilton.
6 February	The Veitch of Leith	Brigantine	Butement	North Leith	United Kingdom	For Scottish Brewery Co.
7 February	Hakeley	Full-rigged ship	Edward Gibson	Hull	United Kingdom	For Taylor, Potter & Co.
7 February	Queen of the Isles	Merchantman	William Boutland	Newcastle upon Tyne	United Kingdom	For George Trail.
21 February	Fairfield	West Indiaman	Bolton & Humphreys	Hull	United Kingdom	For C. Lawrence & Son.
February	Fergus	Full-rigged ship		River Clyde	United Kingdom	For private owner.
2 March	Prince George of Cumberland	Pleasure boat		Hastings	United Kingdom	For George Fennings.
5 March	Middlesbro'	Merchantman	Laing	Middlesbrough	United Kingdom	For private owner.
12 March	La Reine des Belges	Sternwheeler	Fairburn	Manchester	United Kingdom	For private owner.
21 March	Prima Donna	Merchantman	William Bayley	Ipswich	United Kingdom	For H. S. Gibbs & Co.
22 March	Boreas	Sixth rate		Vlissingen	Netherlands	For Royal Netherlands Navy.
22 March	Penninghame	West Indiaman	Charles Connell & Sons	Belfast	United Kingdom	For John Harrison.
22 March	Snelheid	Aviso		Vlissingen	Netherlands	For Royal Netherlands Navy.
25 March	Waringsford	Brig	Alex McLaine	Belfast	United Kingdom	For John Heron.
March	Erie	Cutter	John Justice		United States	For United States Revenue Cutter Service
2 April	Royal William	Caledonia-class ship of the line		Pembroke Dockyard	United Kingdom	For Royal Navy.
4 April	Duck	Lighter		Portsmouth Dockyard	United Kingdom	For Royal Navy.
6 April	Duke of Argyle	East Indiaman	Smith & Co	Newcastle upon Tyne	United Kingdom	For private owner.
6 April	Vestal	Vestal-class frigate		Sheerness Dockyard	United Kingdom	For Royal Navy.
15 April	William Herdman	Merchantman	Messrs. Jeffreys	Quebec	(United Kingdom of Great Britain and Ireland) Upper Canada	For John Johnston and David Grainger.
April	Java	Barque	James Leithead	Sunderland	United Kingdom	For private owner.
April	Zillah	Merchantman	W. & A. Adamson	Sunderland	United Kingdom	For Mr. Adamson.
1 May	Congo	Brig	Joseph Davies	Chepstow	United Kingdom	For Messrs. King.
4 May	Jean de Vienne	Cygne-class brig		Brest	France	For French Navy.
8 May	Gaillardon	Barque	J. Thomas	Howrah	India	For private owner.
8 May	Lahire	Gazelle-class brig		Brest	France	For French Navy.
20 May	Cherepakha	Tender	D. I. Alexeev	Astrakhan	Russia	For Imperial Russian Navy.
20 May	Livonia	Merchantman	Adamson	Grangemouth	United Kingdom	For private owner.
21 May	Jupiter	Third rate		Amsterdam	Netherlands	For Royal Netherlands Navy.
21 May	Boussole	Ariane-class corvette		Cherbourg	France	For French Navy.
21 May	Liberator	Schooner	William White & Co	Waterford	United Kingdom	For private owner.
25 May	Emily	Mersey flat	George Okell	Northwich	United Kingdom	For private owner.
27 May	Maria Barclay	Merchantman	Dixon	Southwick	United Kingdom	For private owner.
1 June	Norham Castle	Merchantman	Charles Smith & Sons	Howdon	United Kingdom	For private owner.
4 June	Guardiana	Merchantman	William Gales	Sunderland	United Kingdom	For William Gales.
4 June	Robert Gray	Snow	William Gales	Sunderland	United Kingdom	For Messrs. White.
4 June	Sisters	Merchantman	Peter Austin	Sunderland	United Kingdom	For private owner.
5 June	Brandywine Packet	Merchantman	J. W. Collingwood	Sunderland	United Kingdom	For Mr. Collingwood.
5 June	United Kingdom	Snow	Hall	Sunderland	United Kingdom	For Messrs. White.
5 June	William Hale	Steamship		Colchester	United Kingdom	For William Hale.
15 June	Rodney	Rodney-class ship of the line		Pembroke Dockyard	United Kingdom	For Royal Navy.
18 June	Princess Victoria	Steamship	Cunningham	Southampton	United Kingdom	For private owner.
18 June	Rapid	Schooner	William Bailey	Ipswich	United Kingdom	For John Christie & others.
18 June	Waterloo	Caledonia-class ship of the line		Chatham Dockyard	United Kingdom	For Royal Navy.
19 June	Henry Clifton	Schooner	Bannister	Lytham	United Kingdom	For private owner.
20 June	Sophia	Schooner	Christopher	Southwold	United Kingdom	For private owner.
20 June	Symmetry	Barque	Dikes & Gibson	Hull	United Kingdom	For Mr. Chadwick.
29 June	Monarch	Paddle tug	Green, Wigram & Green	Blackwall	United Kingdom	For John Rogers Watkins.
June	Ada Jane	Cutter yacht			United Kingdom	For private owner.
June	Astrea	Brig			United Kingdom	For private owner.
June	Ringdove	Racer-class brig-sloop		Devonport Dockyard	United Kingdom	For Royal Navy.
4 July	Pandora	Pandora-class brig		Woolwich Dockyard	United Kingdom	For Royal Navy.
5 July	Rowena	Schooner	Charles Connell & Sons	Belfast	United Kingdom	For Charles Connell & Sons.
18 July	Homs	Ship of the line		Alexandria	(Ottoman Empire) Egypt	For Egyptian Navy.
18 July	Racer	Racer-class brig-sloop		Portsmouth Dockyard	United Kingdom	For Royal Navy.
25 July	Helen	Full-rigged ship	Easton	Brockwear	United Kingdom	For private owner.
1 August	Amelia Thompson	Barque	Philip Laing	Deptford	United Kingdom	For J. Pirie & Co.
1 August	Forth	Seringapatam-class frigate		Pembroke Dockyard	United Kingdom	For Royal Navy.
15 August	Hesperia	Schooner	Mumford	St. Mary's	United Kingdom	For private owner.
15 August	Wave	Schooner	Mumford	St. Mary's	United Kingdom	For private owner.
16 August	Adam Lodge	Merchantman	Edwards	South Shields	United Kingdom	For private owner.
16 Auguns	Henrietta	Barque	Humble, Hurry & Co.	Liverpool	United Kingdom	For Messrs. C. Tayleur & Co.
16 August	William Penn	Steamship	Humble, Hurry & Co.	Liverpool	United Kingdom	For Sir John Tobin.
19 August	Dundee	Paddle Steamer	Wood	Port Glasgow	United Kingdom	For private owner.
22 August	Wladimir	Ship of the line		Stettin	Prussia	For Prussian Navy.
30 August	Isabella	Chinaman	R. Menzies & Son	Leith	United Kingdom	For private owner.
2 September	Lynx	Cherokee-class brig-sloop		Portsmouth Dockyard	United Kingdom	For Royal Navy.
2 September	Medea	Paddle sloop	Laing	Woolwich Dockyard	United Kingdom	For Royal Navy.
12 September	Skjold	Ship of the line		Copenhagen	Denmark	For Royal Danish Navy.
16 September	Eliza Stewart	East Indiaman	Steel	Greenock	United Kingdom	For private owner.
28 September	Frère Champenoise	Ship of the line		Saint Petersburg	Russia	For Imperial Russian Navy.
30 September	Gulnare	Steamship		Chatham Dockyard	United Kingdom	For Post Office Packet Service.
12 October	James Brook	Brigantine	S. Gutteridge	Selby	United Kingdom	For Lister & Co.
17 Ocgtober	El Balear	Steamship	Seddon and Leadley	Liverpool	United Kingdom	For private owner.
24 October	George	Pilot boat	H. Anson	Portsmouth	United Kingdom	For private owner.
29 October	Herald	Snow	Tiffin	Sunderland	United Kingdom	For G. Wood.
29 October	Resolution	Brig	William Gales	Sunderland	United Kingdom	For Langley & Co.
30 October	Idas	Smack	Miller	Cowes	United Kingdom	For James Hollis.
31 October	London Packet	Smack	William Bayley	Ipswich	United Kingdom	For John Dowsing.
October	Comet	Snow	George Frater & Co.	Sunderland	United Kingdom	For Scurfield & Co.
October	Verulam	Mersey flat		Warrington	United Kingdom	For Old Quay Company.
6 November	Varshava	First rate	I. Y. Osminin	Nicholaieff	Russia	For Imperial Russian Navy.
6 November	William Turner	Merchantman	Muries & Clark	Greenock	United Kingdom	For private owner.
7 November	The Effort	Merchantman		Southwold	United Kingdom	For private owner.
13 November	Lady Willoughby	Merchantman		Conway	United Kingdom	For private owners.
14 November	Edward Colston	Merchantman	Patteson & Mercer	Wapping	United Kingdom	For private owner.
18 November	Tickler	Schooner	Charles Connell & Sons	Belfast	United Kingdom	For Messrs. J. Park, S. Connell, J. Wilson and J. Fitzsimmons.
25 November	Fountain	Tank vessel		Pembroke Dockyard	United Kingdom	For Royal Navy.
26 November	Rochester	Lighter		Chatham Dockyard	United Kingdom	For Royal Navy.
7 December	Daniel Grant	Full-rigged ship	Perkins	Newport	United Kingdom	For Daniel Grant.
12 December	Louisa Baillie	West Indiaman	Cox & Curling	Limehouse	United Kingdom	For private owner.
26 December	Taney	Morris-Taney-class cutter	Webb & Allen	New York	United States	For United States Revenue Cutter Service.
28 December	Columbine	Cutter yacht	Ratsey	Cowes	United Kingdom	For John Smith Barry.
28 December	Saint Ouen	Cygne-class brig		Rochefort	France	For French Navy.
30 December	Bergère	Camille-class corvette		Toulon	France	For French Navy.
30 December	Cerf	Gazelle-class brig		Toulon	France	For French Navy.
30 December	Fabert	Gazelle-class brig		Rochefort	France	For French Navy.
December	Michael Wickham	Schooner		Wexford	United Kingdom	For private owner.
Spring	Pursuit	Brig			United Kingdom	For private owner.
Unknown date	Ann	Fishing trawler	Frederick Baddeley	Brixham	United Kingdom	For George T. Lewis.
Unknown date	Anne	Brig		Hylton	United Kingdom	For Ray & Co.
Unknown date	Ann Gales	Merchantman	William Gales	Sunderland	United Kingdom	For William Gales.
Unknowndate	Ann McKim	Clipper	Kennard & Williamson	Baltimore, Maryland	United States	For Isaac McKim.
Unknown date	Arve	Snow	Joseph Helmsley	Sunderland	United Kingdom	For private owner.
Unknown date	Baltic	Merchantman	William Gales	Sunderland	United Kingdom	For Robert Young.
Unknown date	Bardaster	Transport ship			(United Kingdom of Great Britain and Ireland) Colony of New Brunswick	For private owner.
Unknown date	Calypso	Merchantman	Philip Laing	Sunderland	United Kingdom	For Mr. Wilkinson.
Unknown date	Credo	Snow	John M. Gales	Sunderland	United Kingdom	For J. M. Gales.
Unknown date	Concordia	Schooner	William Bonker	Salcombe	United Kingdom	For Reed & Co.
Unknown date	David Barclay	Barque	William Gales	Sunderland	United Kingdom	For Barclay Bros.
Unknown date	David Whitton	Brig		Sunderland	United Kingdom	For Wittons.
Unknown date	Eclipse	Merchantman	J. Banks	Cornwall	United Kingdom	For private owner.
Unknown date	Edmond	Barque		Granville	(United Kingdom of Great Britain and Ireland) Colony of Nova Scotia	For John Arnott & George Cannock.
Unknown date	Egbert	Brig	H. Dobbinson	Monkwearmouth	United Kingdom	For Walton & Co.
Unknown date	Elizabeth Taylerson	Snow	John Storey	Monkwearmouth	United Kingdom	For Mr. Taylerson.
Unknown date	Eliza Stewart	Passenger ship	Robert Steele & Company	Greenock	United Kingdom	For J. & W. Stewart.
Unknown date	Fershampenuaz	Third rate		Saint Petersburg	Russia	For Imperial Russian Navy.
Unknown date	United States	Augustus Jones	Black River, Ohio	Gallinipper	Schooner	For American Fur Company.
Unknown date	James & Ann	Merchantman	Harrison & Oliver	Sunderland	United Kingdom	For J. Brown.
Unknown date	Jamsetjee Jejeebhoy	Full-rigged ship		Bombay	India	For private owner.
Unknown date	Janus	East Indiaman	Easton	Brockwear	United Kingdom	For private owner.
Unknown date	Jefferson	Morris-Taney-class cutter			United States	For United States Revenue Cutter Service.
Unknown date	John Hardy	Merchantman	Philip Laing	Sunderland	United Kingdom	For Philip Laing.
Unknown date	Johns	Snow	Ogden & Simey	Sunderland	United Kingdom	For Hunter & Co.
Unknown date	Lamb	Merchantman	Peter Austin	Sunderland	United Kingdom	For George Lamb.
Unknown date	London	Barque	J. Storey	Sunderland	United Kingdom	For C. Lamb.
Unknown date	Marina	Brig	Peter Austin	Sunderland	United Kingdom	For Peter Austin.
Unknown date	McLane	Morris-Taney-class cutter			United States	For United States Revenue Cutter Service.
Unknown date	Postillion	Full-rigged ship		Rotterdam	Netherlands	For Royal Netherlands Navy.
Unknown date	Raparel	Water boat		Bombay	India	For private owner.
Unknown date	Redbreast	Schooner		North Hylton	United Kingdom	For private owner.
Unknown date	Robert & Margaret	Snow	James Leithead	Sunderland	United Kingdom	For private owner.
Unknown date	Shaik Mamoody	Brig		Bombay	India	For Government of Hyderabad.
Unknown date	Sherlock	Merchantman	J. Burdon	Sunderland	United Kingdom	For J. Wake.
Unknown date	Sir William Chaytor	Merchantman	S. & P. Mills	Deptford	United Kingdom	For private owner.
Unknown date	Snelheid	Full-rigged ship		Vlissingen	Netherlands	For Royal Netherlands Navy.
Unknown date	Spring	Brig	J. Hutchinson	Sunderland	United Kingdom	For private owner.
Unknown date	St. Patrick	Steam packet ferry			United Kingdom	For St George Steam Packet Company.
Unknown date	Sultana	Full-rigged ship		Bombay	India	For an Imaum.
Unknown date	Two Sisters	Brig		Bombay	India	For private owner.
Unknown date	Veracity	Schooner	J. Storey	Sunderland	United Kingdom	For Mr. Anderson.
Unknown date	Vigilant	Merchantman	J. Carr	Sunderland	United Kingdom	For private owner.
Unknown date	Volant	Snow	John M. Gales	Sunderland	United Kingdom	For John M. Gales.
Unknown date	Wandering Shepherd	Merchantman	T. Bell	Sunderland	United Kingdom	For G. Surtees.
Unknown date	Warsaw	Ship of the Line		Nicolaieff	Russia	For Imperial Russian Navy.
Unknown date	Waters	Snow	J. Burdon	Sunderland	United Kingdom	For Mr. Waters.
Unknown date	William	Merchantman	Byers	Sunderland	United Kingdom	For private owner.
Unknown date	William Ash	Snow	W. Adamson	Sunderland	United Kingdom	For William Ash.
Unknown date	Witton Castle	Merchantman	G. Frater	Sunderland	United Kingdom	For Baker & Co.
