= List of ship launches in 1830 =

The list of ship launches in 1830 includes a chronological list of some ships launched in 1830.

Date	Ship	Class	Builder	Location	Country	Notes
1 January	Sir Charles Ogle	Paddle steamer	Alexander Lyle Shipyard	Halifax	(United Kingdom of Great Britain and Ireland) Colony of Nova Scotia	For Halifax-Dartmouth Ferry Service.
7 January	Martha Pope	Schooner		Waterford	United Kingdom	For Richard Pope.
11 January	Moscow	Full-rigged ship	Dikes & Gibson	Hull	United Kingdom	For private owner.
January	Crawford	Morris-Taney-class cutter	Webb and Allen	New York	United States	For United States Revenue Cutter Service.
9 February	George	Brig	Meldrum	Dysart	United Kingdom	For Messrs. Beveridge.
25 February	Curlew	Cherokee-class brig-sloop		Woolwich Dockyard	United Kingdom	For Royal Navy.
11 March	Nautilus	Cherokee-class brig-sloop		Woolwich Dockyard	United Kingdom	For Royal Navy.
19 March	Vicissitude	Merchantman	James Laing	South Shields	United Kingdom	For James Laing & William Anderson.
24 March	D'Assas	Cygne-class brig		Rochefort	France	For French Navy.
March	Ann	Merchantman	John M. Gales	Sunderland	United Kingdom	For private owner.
March	Catherine	Brig	E. & R. Lumsden	Monkwearmouth	United Kingdom	For Forster & Co.
March	Lord Wellington	Merchantman	Messrs. Shipton	Gloucester	United Kingdom	For private owner.
12 April	Duchess of Gordon	cutter	John Duffus & Co.	Aberdeen	United Kingdom	For Messrs. Hogarth.
13 April	Bacchus	Brig	Hunt	Gloucester	United Kingdom	For Messrs. Johnson.
18 April	Dunois	Gazelle-class brig		Bayonne	France	For French Navy.
24 April	Cheshire	Merchantman	J. and R. Fisher	Chester	United Kingdom	For Barton, Irlam and Higginson.
24 April	Pilot	Smack	Foulk	Aberystwyth	United Kingdom	For private owner.
April	Pettrell	Merchantman	Tindall	Scarborough	United Kingdom	For Messrs. Tindall.
6 May	Friendship	Schooner		Cuxhaven	Kingdom of Hanover	For private owner.
8 May	Héroine	Corvette		Brest	France	For French Navy.
10 May	Psyche	Yacht		Eling	United Kingdom	For Mr. Pratt.
13 May	Caroline	Yacht	White	Cowes	United Kingdom	For Marquess of Donegall.
20 May	Seaflower	Cutter	Hayes	Portsmouth Dockyard	United Kingdom	For Royal Navy.
22 May	Theodosia	West Indiaman	Clarke & Nicholson	Liverpool	United Kingdom	For private owner.
23 May	Ariane	Ariane-class corvette		Cherbourg	France	For French Navy.
24 May	Racehorse	Favorite-class sloop		Plymouth Dockyard	United Kingdom	For Royal Navy.
24 May	Wizard	Cherokee-class brig-sloop		Pembroke Dockyard	United Kingdom	For Royal Navy.
25 May	John Black	Merchantman	Adamson	Grangemouth	United Kingdom	For private owner.
4 June	Borodino	Ship of the line		Arkhangelsk	Russia	For Imperial Russian Navy.
4 June	Krasney	Ship of the line		Arkhangelsk	Russia	For Imperial Russian Navy.
7 June	John Barry	Snow	Reed & Young	Sunderland	United Kingdom	For private owner.
12 June	Frederik den Sjette	Paddle steamer	Jacob Holm	Christianshavn	Denmark	For Lauritz Nicolai Hvidt.
21 June	Thisbé	Corvette		Rochefort	France	For French Navy.
23 June	Lark	Cutter		Chatham Dockyard	United Kingdom	For Royal Navy.
30 June	Mona's Isle	Paddle steamer	John Wood & Co.	Glasgow	United Kingdom	For Isle of Man Steam Packet Company.
5 July	Bisson	Cygne-class brig		Lorient	France	For French Navy.
7 July	Méléagre	Cygne-class brig		Lorient	France	For French Navy.
8 July	Great Britain	Merchantman		Redbridge	United Kingdom	For Mr. Atfield.
22 July	Seahorse	Seringapatam-class frigate		Pembroke Dockyard	United Kingdom	For Royal Navy.
26 July	Harpooner	Barque	Green, Wigram's & Green	Blackwall Yard	United Kingdom	For Green, Wigram's & Green.
July	Nauta	Brig		Whitby	United Kingdom	For private owner.
July	Queen Adelaide	Brig	J. Burden	Sunderland	United Kingdom	For J. Burden.
4 August	Jackdaw	Cutter		location	United Kingdom	For Royal Navy.
18 August	Camille	Camille-class corvette		Bayonne	France	For French Navy.
21 August	Queen Adelaide	Brig	Alex McLaine	Belfast	United Kingdom	For Robert P. Ritchie.
2 September	Copse	West Indiaman	Menzies & Sons	Leith	United Kingdom	For Mr. Copse.
7 September	Beresina	Ship of the line		Saint Petersburg	Russia	For Imperial Russian Navy.
7 September	Smolensk	Ship of the line		Saint Petersburg	United Kingdom	For Imperial Russian Navy.
15 September	Bellona	Fourth rate	Andreas Schifter	Orlogsværftet	Denmark	For Royal Danish Navy.
21 September	Queen Adelaide	Steamship		Port Glasgow	United Kingdom	For private owner.
25 September	Primauguet	Gazelle-class brig		Toulon	France	For French Navy.
30 September	Magpie	Cutter		Sheerness Dockyard	United Kingdom	For Royal Navy.
30 September	Medway	Lighter		Sheerness Dockyard	United Kingdom	For Royal Navy.
30 September	Quail	Cutter		Sheerness Dockyard	United Kingdom	For Royal Navy.
1 October	Royal Adelaide	Brig	R. Tredwen	Cardiff	United Kingdom	For private owner.
2 October	Stag	Seringapatam-class frigate		Pembroke Dockyard	United Kingdom	For Royal Navy.
5 October	Alert	Cutter	W. Roberts	Milford Haven	United Kingdom	For Ballast Office.
5 October	Bee	Cutter	W. Roberts	Milford Haven	United Kingdom	For Ballast Office.
18 November	Emerald	Brig	Charles Connell & Sons	Belfast	United Kingdom	For Messrs. McTear, M'Caw & Gillis.
4 December	Dupetit Thouars	Gazelle-class brig		Toulon	France	For French Navy.
28 December	Joanna	Barque			(United Kingdom of Great Britain and Ireland) Colony of New Brunswick	For private owner.
29 December	Savage	Cherokee-class brig-sloop		Plymouth Dockyard	United Kingdom	For Royal Navy.
Unknown date	Alburka	Paddle steamer	Messrs. Fawcett	Liverpool	United Kingdom	For Messrs. Lander.
Unknown date	Alexander and William	Sloop	E. & R. Lumsden	Sunderland	United Kingdom	For private owner.
Unknown date	Allen	Brig		Sunderland	United Kingdom	For private owner.
Unknown date	Ann	Sloop		Sunderland	United Kingdom	For private owner.
Unknown date	Barbara	Merchantman		Sunderland	United Kingdom	For private owner.
Unknown date	Ceres	Fourth rate		Rotterdam	Netherlands	For Royal Netherlands Navy.
Unknown date	Chapman	Man of war			Sweden	For Royal Swedish Navy.
Unknown date	Commerce	Schooner		Sunderland	United Kingdom	For private owner.
Unknown date	Cyrus	Merchantman	J. Storey	Sunderland	United Kingdom	For Mr. Hubbard.
Unknown date	Dexter	Morris-Taney-class cutter	Webb and Allen	New York	United States	For United States Revenue Cutter Service.
Unknown date	Dorothea	Snow	John M. Gales	Sunderland	United Kingdom	For Vint & Co.
Unknown date	Drummore	Merchantman		Leith	United Kingdom	For Mr. Aitchison.
Unknown date	Earl of Eldon	Merchantman	J. Barrie	Whitby	United Kingdom	For J. Barrie.
Unknown date	Eden	Snow	Reed & Young, or T. Reed	Sunderland	United Kingdom	For P. Oswald.
Unknown date	Eleanor	Merchantman	James Bell	Sunderland	United Kingdom	For private owner.
Unknown date	Elizabeth	Merchantman		Singapore	Straits Settlements	For private owner.
Unknown date	Elizabeth	Merchantman		Sunderland	United Kingdom	For P. Bains.
Unknown date	Emma	Schooner	John Ball Jr.	Salcombe	United Kingdom	For John A. Jarvis & William Beer.
Unknown date	Enterprize	Schooner	William Pender	Hobart	(United Kingdom of Great Britain and Ireland) Van Diemen's Land	For John Pascoe Fawkner.
Unknown date	Fawn	Sloop	Reed & Young, or T. Reed	Sunderland	United Kingdom	For C. Wood.
Unknown date	Gallatin	Morris-Taney-class cutter	Webb and Allen	New York	United States	For United States Revenue Cutter Service.
Unknown date	Hamilton	Morris-Taney-class cutter	Webb and Allen	New York	United States	For United States Revenue Cutter Service.
Unknown date	Hardwick	Merchantman	John M. Gales	Sunderland	United Kingdom	For private owner.
Unknown date	Harlington	Brig	Kirkbride & Partners	Sunderland	United Kingdom	For private owner.
Unknown date	Heber	Merchantman	William Gales	Sunderland	United Kingdom	For John White.
Unknown date	Heldin	Sixth rate		Dunkirk	France	For Royal Netherlands Navy.
Unknown date	Hippomenus	Sixth rate		Dunkirk	France	For Royal Netherlands Navy.
Unknown date	Hutton	Snow	William Potts	Sunderland	United Kingdom	For William Potts.
Unknown date	Janus	Snow	William Gales	Sunderland	United Kingdom	For George Thompson.
Unknown date	Lady Cornewall	Brig		Chepstow	United Kingdom	For private owner.
Unknown date	L'Amico Alla Prova	Horse-powered paddle boat	de Riva	Lake Garda	Austrian Empire	For Mr. de Riva.
Unknown date	Lord Eldon	Merchantman		Chepstow	United Kingdom	For John Irving & John Irving Jr.
Unknown date	Marian	Snow			United Kingdom	For private owner.
Unknown date	Meermin	Full-rigged ship		Vlissingen	Netherlands	For Royal Netherlands Navy.
Unknown date	Mersey	Merchantman	Philip Laing	Sunderland	United Kingdom	For private owner.
Unknown date	Monarch	Steamship		Thorne	United Kingdom	For private owner.
Unknown date	Neva	Merchantman	William Gales	Sunderland	United Kingdom	For Turner & Co.
Unknown date	Nurna	Merchantman	William Gales	Sunderland	United Kingdom	For William Gales.
Unknown date	Olive	Merchantman	Kirkbride & Partners	Sunderland	United Kingdom	For Oliver & Co.
Unknown date	Oscar	Man of war			Sweden	For Royal Swedish Navy.
Unknown date	Paragon	Schooner	T. & W. Dixon	Sunderland	United Kingdom	For private owner.
Unknown date	Pegasus	Full-rigged ship		Rotterdam	Netherlands	For Royal Netherlands Navy.
Unknown date	Platina	Barque	Moses Wilkinson	Sunderland	United Kingdom	For Mr. Potter.
Unknown date	Prince George	Merchantman	John Green	Bristol	United Kingdom	For John Green.
Unknown date	Princess Augusta	Barque	Robert Reay	Sunderland	United Kingdom	For Goodwin & Co.
Unknown date	Rapid	Sloop	John Ball Jr.	Salcombe	United Kingdom	For Mr. Bartlett.
Unknown date	Red Rover	Barque	William Clifton	Howrah	India	For William Clifton.
Unknown date	Royal William	Snow	William Gales	Sunderland	United Kingdom	For John Hall.
Unknown date	Saint Lawrence	Snow	L. Crown	Sunderland	United Kingdom	For private owner.
Unknown date	Sarah	Snow	William Gales	Sunderland	United Kingdom	For Gale & Co.
Unknown date	Sussex	Merchantman	W. Chilton	Sunderland	United Kingdom	For private owner.
Unknown date	Thomas Lyon	Merchantman	G. Lyon	Sunderland	United Kingdom	For private owner.
Unknown date	William IV	Merchantman	John M. Gales	Sunderland	United Kingdom	For private owner.
Unknown date	Williams	Merchantman	Robert Reay	Sunderland	United Kingdom	For private owner.
Unknown date	William the Fourth	Merchantman	W. Chilton	Sunderland	United Kingdom	For J. Forster.
