= List of shipwrecks in December 1853 =

The list of shipwrecks in December 1853 includes ships sunk, foundered, wrecked, grounded, or otherwise lost during December 1853.

== 1 December ==
List of shipwrecks: 1 December 1853
Ship	State	Description
Auguste Marie	France	The brig was wrecked on the Preguicas Shoals, off the coast of Cuba with the loss of two of her crew. She was on a voyage from Cayenne, French Guiana to Ceará, Brazil.
Emma	France	The ship was driven ashore and wrecked near Algeciras, Spain. She was on a voyage from Cette, Hérault to Dunkirk, Nord.
Helen Maria	United States	The ship was driven ashore at Theddlethorpe, Lincolnshire, United Kingdom. She was on a voyage from Saint John, New Brunswick, British North America to Hull, Yorkshire, United Kingdom.
King Olave	(United Kingdom of Great Britain and Ireland) Isle of Man	The schooner was wrecked in the "Ardmore Islands", Sound of Islay. Her crew were rescued.
Montcalm	United Kingdom	The ship was driven ashore and wrecked on the coast of Newfoundland, British North America. Her crew were rescued. She was on a voyage from Quebec City to Liverpool.
Norfolk	United Kingdom	The barque ran aground and south of Flamborough Head, Yorkshire. On 4 December, she floated off and sank. Her crew were rescued by the sloop Trusty (United Kingdom) Norfolk was on a voyage from South Shields, County Durham to London.
Otterspool	United Kingdom	The ship was driven ashore on Red Island, Newfoundland. She was on a voyage from Montreal, Province of Canada, British North America to Liverpool, Lancashire.
Prince Albert	Hamburg	The ship was abandoned in the Atlantic Ocean. All on board were rescued by Orinoco (United States). Prince Albert was on a voyage from New York, United States to Hamburg.
Sisters	United Kingdom	The sloop was wrecked west of Reiss, Caithness. She was on a voyage from Port Gordon, Moray to Thurso, Caithness.
Thor	Sweden	The ship was in collision with Concordia (Prussia) and sank in the North Sea. Her crew were rescued by Concordia. Thor was on a voyage from Stockholm to Hull.
Victorine	Russia	The ship was driven ashore at Wells-next-the-Sea, Norfolk, United Kingdom. She was on a voyage from Saint Petersburg to Rouen, Seine-Inférieure, France. She was refloated the next day
Winfield Scott	United States	SS Winfield Scott The paddle steamer ran aground on Middle Anacapa Island, Channel Islands of California and was wrecked. All on board survived. She was on a voyage from San Francisco, California to Panama City, Republic of New Granada.

== 2 December ==
List of shipwrecks: 2 December 1853
Ship	State	Description
Ballingeigh	United Kingdom	The ship was abandoned off "Green Island", Province of Canada, British North America. She was on a voyage from Montreal, Province of Canada to Liverpool, Lancashire. She was boarded by some local inhabitants and run ashore.
Clutha	United Kingdom	The ship was driven ashore on "Goose Island", Province of Canada. She was on a voyage from Montreal to Glasgow, Renfrewshire.
Irvine	United States	The ship was destroyed by fire in the Atlantic Ocean. Her crew survived. She was on a voyage from Charleston, South Carolina to Liverpool, Nova Scotia, British North America.
Martha	United Kingdom	The ship struck rocks and sank at Fort Ricasoli, Malta. Her crew were rescued.
Rankin	United Kingdom	The ship was driven ashore on "Green Island", Province of Canada. She was on a voyage from Quebec City, Province of Canada to Liverpool.
Sarah Moirs	United States	The barque was wrecked on a reef in the Raven Islands. All on board survived. She was on a voyage from Sydney, New South Wales to San Francisco, California.
Sir Edward Hamilton	United Kingdom	The ship was driven ashore at Flamborough Head, East Riding of Yorkshire. She was refloated on 4 December and taken in to Bridlington in a severely leaky condition.
Susan	United Kingdom	The sloop was run into by the Mersey Ferry Invincible (United Kingdom) and sank. Her crew were rescued.
Twee Aaltjes	Rostock	The ship ran aground on the Rødsand. She was on a voyage from Rostock to Kirkcaldy, Fife, United Kingdom. She had become a wreck by 7 December. Her crew were rescued.

== 3 December ==
List of shipwrecks: 3 December 1853
Ship	State	Description
Almirante de Cavo Verf	Portugal	The ship ran aground and sank at Porto. She was on a voyage from London, United Kingdom to Porto.
Andreas	Russia	The schooner was driven ashore near Sulina, Ottoman Empire.
Ann Kirstine	Denmark	The ship was lost off "Gracoe". Her crew were rescued.
Argyle	United Kingdom	The schooner was driven ashore and wrecked at Porthoustock, Cornwall.
Bertha	United Kingdom	The ship was driven ashore at Flamborough Head, Yorkshire. She was refloated and resumed her voyage.
Boxidar Opnich	Russia	The ship was driven ashore near "Kaziveloska". She was on a voyage from Odesa to Falmouth, Cornwall or Queenstown, County Cork, United Kingdom.
Clayburn	United States	The full-rigged ship was wrecked on Anegada, Virgin Islands. All on board were rescued. She was on a voyage from Bordeaux, Gironde, France to New Orleans, Louisiana.
Fidelity	United Kingdom	The ship was abandoned off the Bird Islands. Her crew were rescued by Spec (United Kingdom). Fidelity was on a voyage from Montreal, Province of Canada, British North America to London.
Giglio	Austrian Empire	The brig was driven ashore near Gallipoli, Ottoman Empire.
Indian Princess	United Kingdom	The ship struck a sunken rock off the "Isle of Glass" and was damaged. She was towed in to Stornoway, Isle of Lewis on 9 December.
Industry	United Kingdom	The ship was in collision with the brig Lily and sank in the North Sea 10 nautical miles (19 km) north west of the Dudgeon Lightship ( Trinity House). Her crew were rescued by Lily.
Irvine	United Kingdom	The ship was destroyed by fire in the Atlantic Ocean. Her crew were rescued. She was on a voyage from Charleston, South Carolina, United States to Liverpool, Lancashire.
Maranham	United Kingdom	The ship was driven ashore at "Point-au-Pin", Province of Canada, British North America. She was on a voyage from Quebec City, Province of Canada to Plymouth, Devon. She was later refloated and resumed her voyage, arriving at Plymouth on 5 January 1854. f
Mary	United Kingdom	The ship sprang a leak and was beached on Skokholm, Pembrokeshire, where she was wrecked. She was on a voyage from Swansea, Glamorgan to Limerick.
Norfolk	United Kingdom	The ship ran aground off Flamborough Head. Her crew were rescued. She was on a voyage from South Shields, County Durham to London. She was refloated but consequently sank. Her crew were also rescued.
Pritchard	Austrian Empire	The brig was driven ashore near "Kalakri", Ottoman Empire.
Resource	United Kingdom	The ship was severely damaged by fire at South Shields.
Thomas	United Kingdom	The ship sank off "Crane Island", Province of Canada. She was on a voyage from Quebec City, Province of Canada to Aberdeen.

== 4 December ==
List of shipwrecks: 4 December 1853
Ship	State	Description
Aries	United Kingdom	The ship was abandoned in the Norwegian Sea 80 nautical miles (150 km) north of Bergen, Norway. Her crew survived. She was on a voyage from Wick, Caithness to Tuque, Province of Canada, British North America.
Caroline	United Kingdom	The brig ran aground on the Goodwin Sands, Kent. She was refloated and resumed her voyage.
Ceres	United Kingdom	The ship ran aground in the River Nene. She was on a voyage from Seaham, County Durham to Wisbech, Cambridgeshire. She was refloated.
Esmeralda	United Kingdom	The ship was lost off Singapore, Straits Settlements.
Palo Alto	United States	The ship was in collision with Neustrie (France) and sank off Cape Florida. She was on a voyage from Matanzas, Cuba to Boston, Massachusetts.
Vorwarts	Kingdom of Hanover	The ship struck the Outer Carr Rock, on the coast of Northumberland, United Kingdom and sank. She was on a voyage from Altona to Port Dundas, Renfrewshire, United Kingdom.

== 5 December ==
List of shipwrecks: 5 December 1853
Ship	State	Description
Alfred	United Kingdom	The ship ran aground on a reef 30 nautical miles (56 km) north of Bimlipatam, India. She was consequently beached. All on board survived. She was on a voyage from London to Calcutta, India.
General Rye	United Kingdom	The ship was wrecked on the Haarstrand, Denmark. Her crew were rescued.
Humboldt	United States	The paddle steamer ran aground at Portuguese Cove, Nova Scotia, British North America with the loss of one life. She was wrecked a few days later. Humboldt was on a voyage from Southampton, New Brunswick, British North America to New York.
Invincible	United Kingdom	The ship was driven ashore on "Green Island". She was on a voyage from Palermo, Sicily to Liverpool, Lancashire.
Lovely Nelly	United Kingdom	The ship ran aground at King's Lynn, Norfolk. She was on a voyage from Hartlepool, County Durham to King's Lynn. She was refloated with the assistance of two tugs and taken in to King's Lynn.
Nossa Senhora da Boa Viagem	Portugal	The ship was driven ashore on the south coast of Bornholm, Denmark. Her crew were rescued. She was on a voyage from Riga, Russia to Porto. She was refloated on 21 December and resumed her voyage.
Oxford	United Kingdom	The ship ran aground near "Maerde", Norway. She was on a voyage from Liverpool to Arendal, Norway. She was refloated on 7 December and taken in to Arendal.
Petrus	Denmark	The ship was wrecked at Whitby, Yorkshire, United Kingdom. Her crew were rescued.
Phoenix	Russian Empire	The ship was driven ashore on the south coast of Bornholm. Her crew were rescued. She was on a voyage from Reval to Kronstadt. She was refloated on 16 December and taken in to Rønne for repairs.
Susannah	(United Kingdom of Great Britain and Ireland) British North America	The ship was wrecked on the north coast of Prince Edward Island. She was on a voyage from Quebec City, Province of Canada to Liverpool.
Tanfield	United Kingdom	The ship was driven into Indefatigable (United Kingdom) and then driven ashore at Galaţi, Ottoman Empire.
Victor	United Kingdom	The ship capsized at Newcastle upon Tyne, Northumberland.

== 6 December ==
List of shipwrecks: 6 December 1853
Ship	State	Description
Eleanor	United Kingdom	The ship was in collision with the paddle steamer Waterwitch (United Kingdom) and sank in the North Sea. She was on a voyage from the River Tyne to London.
Sir James Ross	United Kingdom	The ship was driven ashore 3 nautical miles (5.6 km) east of Calais, France. She was on a voyage from Newcastle upon Tyne, Northumberland to Constantinople, Ottoman Empire.
Wilhelmine	Denmark	The ship ran aground on the Scroby Sands, Norfolk, United Kingdom. She was on a voyage from Saint Petersburg, Russia to London, United Kingdom. She was refloated the next day and resumed her voyage.

== 7 December ==
List of shipwrecks: 7 December 1853
Ship	State	Description
Admiral	United Kingdom	The ship was driven ashore and wrecked at Souter Point, County Durham. She was on a voyage from Aberdeen to Sunderland, County Durham.
Bertha	Denmark	The schooner was driven ashore at Dungeness, Kent, United Kingdom. She was refloated and sailed for Havre de Grâce, Seine-Inférieure, France.
Eliza	United Kingdom	The ship ran aground on the Barber Sand, in the North Sea off the coast of Suffolk. She was refloated and resumed her voyage.
Jenny Lind	United States	The ship was driven ashore and wrecked at the North Heads, San Francisco, California. She was on a voyage from San Francisco to Callao, Peru.
Louise	France	The brig was wrecked on the Colorados, off the coast of Cuba. Her crew were rescued.
Unity	United Kingdom	The ship was driven ashore at Redcar, Yorkshire. She was on a voyage from South Shields, County Durham to Boston, Lincolnshire. She floated off and was taken in tow but consequently sank. Her crew were rescued.
Wilhelmine	Denmark	The ship ran aground on the Scroby Sands, Norfolk, United Kingdom. She was refloated and resumed her voyage.

== 9 December ==
List of shipwrecks: 9 December 1853
Ship	State	Description
Albert Schuringa	Flag unknown	The ship was driven ashore at Winterton-on-Sea, Norfolk, United Kingdom. She was on a voyage from Saint Petersburg, Russia to London, United Kingdom. She had become a wreck by 12 December.
Golden Light	United Kingdom	The ship ran aground near Miramichi, New Brunswick, British North America. She was subsequently holed by ice and was consequently condemned.
USRC Hamilton	United States Revenue Cutter Service	The Morris-Taney-class cutter was wrecked on the Tully Breakers, off the coast of South Carolina with the loss of fourteen of her fifteen crew.
Royalist	United Kingdom	The barque ran aground off Dungeness, Kent. She was on a voyage from Newcastle upon Tyne, Northumberland to Genoa, Kingdom of Sardinia. She was refloated and resumed her voyage.
Sunbeam	United Kingdom	The ship capsized and sank at South Shields, County Durham. She was later righted and refloated.

== 10 December ==
List of shipwrecks: 10 December 1853
Ship	State	Description
Eva	United Kingdom	The ship was driven ashore at Harwich, Essex. She was on a voyage from Liverpool, Lancashire to Sunderland, County Durham.
Fidelity	United Kingdom	The ship was driven ashore at Pakefield, Suffolk. She was refloated the next day and taken in to Lowestoft, Suffolk.
Hawk	United Kingdom	The ship capsized at Montrose, Forfarshire.
Helena	United Kingdom	The ship ran aground in The Swale. She was on a voyage from Hartlepool, County Durham to Whitstable, Kent.
John and Edward	United Kingdom	The schooner ran aground on the Sunk Sand, in the North Sea off the coast of Essex. She was on a voyage from Sunderland to Cowes, Isle of Wight. She was refloated with the assistance of three smacks and taken in to Wivenhoe, Essex.
Juno	United Kingdom	The brig ran aground and sank on the Black Tail, off the north coast of Kent.
Richard White	United Kingdom	The ship ran aground on the Sizewell Bank, in the North Sea off the coast of Suffolk and was wrecked. Her crew were rescued. She was on a voyage from South Shields, County Durham to London.

== 11 December ==
List of shipwrecks: 11 December 1853
Ship	State	Description
Flora	United Kingdom	The brigantine was discovered in the North Sea abandoned and on fire. She was taken in to Whitby, Yorkshire.
Forest Queen	United Kingdom	The ship ran aground and was damaged at Hartlepool, County Durham. She was on a voyage from Sunderland, County Durham to Hartlepool. She was refloated and taken in to Hartlepool in a leaky condition.
Goddens	United Kingdom	The ship ran aground on the Docking Sand, in the North Sea off the coast of Norfolk. She was on a voyage from Hartlepool to Rochester, Kent. She was refloated but consequently had to be beached at Burnham Overy Staithe, Norfolk, where she was wrecked. Her crew were rescued.
Good Intent	United Kingdom	The ship ran aground and was damaged at Hartlepool. She was on a voyage from Newcastle upon Tyne, Northumberland to Hartlepool. she was refloated and taken in to Hartlepool in a leaky condition.
Margaret Roberts	United Kingdom	The schooner was in collision with the barque Fortune (United Kingdom) and sank in the English Channel off The Lizard, Cornwall. Her crew were rescued by Fortune. Margaret Roberts was on a voyage from Galaţi, Ottoman Empire to London.
Vigilant	United Kingdom	The ship was driven ashore and wrecked in East London Bay, Cape Colony.
Water Lily	United Kingdom	The barque was wrecked on Wood Cay, off Grand Bahama, Bahamas. She was on a voyage from Jamaica to London.
William Hutt	United Kingdom	The ship was driven ashore on Sprogø, Denmark. She was on a voyage from Hull, Yorkshire to Flensburg, Duchy of Holstein.

== 12 December ==
List of shipwrecks: 12 December 1853
Ship	State	Description
Beranger	France	The ship was driven into Arabella and Onward (both United Kingdom) and then drove ashore at Gibraltar. Beranger was on a voyage from Bahia, Brazil to Marseille, Bouches-du-Rhône. She was refloated on 17 December but was declared a total loss.
Emblem	United Kingdom	The ship sprang a leak and was beached at Cádiz, Spain.
Jane Jackson	United Kingdom	The ship ran aground on the Blacktail Sand, in the Thames Estuary and sank. Her crew were rescued. She was on a voyage from South Shields, County Durham to London.
Keefer	(United Kingdom of Great Britain and Ireland) British North America	The schooner was driven ashore in Oak Orchard Creek. She was on a voyage from Kingston, Jamaica to Montreal, Province of Canada.
Sir Charles Forbes	United Kingdom	The ship was wrecked on the Solfo Reef, off Farö, Sweden. her crew were rescued. She was on a voyage from Stockholm, Sweden to Lisbon, Portugal. She was refloated on 22 December and taken in to Visby, Sweden where she was condemned.
Zoe	United Kingdom	The ship ran aground at Queenstown, County Cork. She was on a voyage from Mauritius to Bristol, Gloucestershire. She was refloated and resumed her voyage.

== 13 December ==
List of shipwrecks: 13 December 1853
Ship	State	Description
Eliza	United Kingdom	The barque was driven ashore and wrecked in the Currituck Inlet. She was on a voyage from Cienfuegos, Cuba to New York, United States.
Joaquim	United Kingdom	The ship was wrecked near Taastrup, Denmark. Her crew were rescued.
Marine	United Kingdom	The brig was driven ashore at Eastham, Maine, United States. She was refloated on 15 December but capsized and was wrecked.
Mary	United Kingdom	The sloop foundered off Stonehaven, Aberdeenshire. Her crew survived. She was on a voyage from Peterhead, Aberdeenshire to London.

== 14 December ==
List of shipwrecks: 14 December 1853
Ship	State	Description
Burassi	United Kingdom	The ship capsized and sank in the River Liffey.
Harriet	United Kingdom	The sailing barge sank off Walton-on-the-Naze, Essex. Her crew survived.
Hexham	United Kingdom	The brig was driven ashore and wrecked 3 nautical miles (5.6 km) east of "Noville", Hérault, France with the loss of all but one of her crew. She was on a voyage from Sunderland, County Durham to Marseille, Bouches-du-Rhône.
Julia	United Kingdom	The ship was abandoned off the "Quebrantes", Spain. She was on a voyage from Liverpool, Lancashire to Vigo, Spain. She was subsequently towed in to Santander, Spain by the steamship Provenir (Spain).
Margaret Mallom	United Kingdom	The ship sank at Sunderland.
Oak	United Kingdom	The Humber Keel ran aground off the coast of Lincolnshire and sank. Her crew were rescued by the tug Eliza (United Kingdom). Oak was on a voyage from Goole, Yorkshire to Grimsby, Lincolnshire.
Roanoake	United States	The brig was driven ashore at Currituck, North Carolina.

== 15 December ==
List of shipwrecks: 15 December 1853
Ship	State	Description
Alfred	United Kingdom	The ship struck the quayside at Liverpool, Lancashire, driving her anchor through her bows and partly sinking her. She was repaired.
Effort	United Kingdom	The sloop collided with Glasgow (United Kingdom) and sank in the Clyde at Greenock, Renfrewshire. Her crew were rescued.
Margaret Malcolm	United Kingdom	The schooner sank at Sunderland, County Durham. Her crew survived.
Maria	United Kingdom	The brig was driven ashore near West Hartlepool, County Durham. She became a wreck on 4 January 1854.
Ophir	Russia	The ship ran aground on the Rodsand, off Nysted, Denmark. Her crew were rescued. She was on a voyage from Kronstadt to London, United Kingdom.
Tweedside	United Kingdom	The brig foundered in the Atlantic Ocean. Her crew were rescued.
William and Henry	(United Kingdom of Great Britain and Ireland) Isle of Man	The ship was driven ashore in the Sound of Kyleakin. She was on a voyage from Arendal, Norway to Port St. Mary. She was refloated and taken in to Corry, Isle of Skye.

== 16 December ==
List of shipwrecks: 16 December 1853
Ship	State	Description
Albert	United Kingdom	The brig was driven ashore south of Hartlepool, County Durham. She was on a voyage from Arkhangelsk, Russia to Wisbech, Cambridgeshire.
Augusta	United Kingdom	The barque was abandoned in the North Sea off Flamborough Head, Yorkshire. Her crew were rescued by "Metto Margarethe" (Flag unknown). Augusta was on a voyage from Helsinki, Grand Duchy of Finland to London.
Fortuna	(Denmark) Duchy of Schleswig	The ship was driven ashore at Tønning, Duchy of Holstein. She was on a voyage from Bo'ness, Lothian, United Kingdom to Rendsburg. She was refloated on 21 December and taken in to Tønning.
Friendship	United Kingdom	The brig was driven ashore at Winterton-on-Sea, Norfolk. Her crew were rescued by the Great Yarmouth Lifeboat. She was on a voyage from Gothenburg, Sweden to London.
Jeune Arture	France	The brig was driven ashore south of Hartlepool. She was on a voyage from Newcastle upon Tyne, Northumberland United Kingdom to Genoa, Kingdom of Sardinia.
King George	United Kingdom	The ship ran aground off Dungeness, Kent. She was on a voyage from Teignmouth, Devon to London. She was refloated and taken in to Dover, Kent in a leaky condition.
Louise	United Kingdom	The ship was driven ashore in the Scheldt. She was refloated and resumed her voyage.
Marie	Sweden	The ship was driven ashore and wrecked south of Hartlepool.
Queen of Scotland	United Kingdom	The paddle steamer was driven ashore near "Stor", Kingdom of Hanover. She was refloated.
Robert and Mary	United Kingdom	The schooner ran aground on the Margate Sand, Kent.
Sylph	United Kingdom	The collier ran aground on the Black Middens, in the North Sea off the coast of County Durham and was wrecked. Her crew were rescued.
Warner	United States	The ship departed from New York for Dunkirk, Nord, France. No further trace, presumed foundered with the loss of all hands.

== 17 December ==
List of shipwrecks: 17 December 1853
Ship	State	Description
Canadienne	France	The schooner was driven ashore at Deal, Kent, United Kingdom. She was refloated and taken in to Ramsgate, Kent.
Commerce	United Kingdom	The ship ran aground on the Middle Sand, in the North Sea off the coast of County Durham. She was refloated on 20 December.
Eleanor	United Kingdom	The ship was driven ashore on the east coast of Makronisos, Greece. Her crew were rescued. She was on a voyage from Liverpool, Lancashire to Smyrna, Ottoman Empire.
Excelsior	United Kingdom	The ship was driven ashore at New York. She was on a voyage from Havre de Grâce, Seine-Inférieure, France to New York.
Gaajerat	(United Kingdom of Great Britain and Ireland) British North America	The ship was driven ashore and wrecked at Cape Hinchinbrooke, Nova Scotia.
General Washington	(United Kingdom of Great Britain and Ireland) British North America	The schooner was wrecked at Prospect, Nova Scotia. She was on a voyage from Jamaica to Halifax, Nova Scotia.
Merchant	United Kingdom	The ship was driven ashore at Odesa.
New Zealander	United Kingdom	The ship was destroyed by fire at Belfast, Victoria. All on board were rescued.
Pilot	United Kingdom	The flat sank in Llandrillo Bay. Her crew were rescued. She was on a voyage from Liverpool to "Llandilus".
Racine	Belgium	The ship was abandoned in the Aegean Sea off Navarino, Greece. Her crew were rescued by Girafe (French Navy). She was subsequently taken in to Navarino and reboarded.
Shannon	United Kingdom	The steamship ran aground at Cuxhaven.
Sunbeam	United Kingdom	The brig was driven ashore at the Mumbles, Glamorgan. She was on a voyage from Swansea, Glamorgan to Cuba.

== 18 December ==
List of shipwrecks: 18 December 1853
Ship	State	Description
Africa	United Kingdom	The ship ran aground. She was on a voyage from London to Melbourne, Victoria. She was refloated and put in to Ramsgate, Kent in a leaky condition.
Alert	United Kingdom	The ship ran aground on a reef off the Île à Vache, Haiti. She was on a voyage from Aux Cayes, Haiti to Falmouth, Cornwall. She was refloated, resuming her voyage on 22 December.
Ann	United Kingdom	The ship was wrecked on the Hooper Sand, in the Bristol Channel. Her crew were rescued. She was on a voyage from Hayle, Cornwall to Llanelly, Glamorgan.
Dahlia	United Kingdom	The sloop was run into and sank at Kingstown, County Dublin. Her crew were rescued.
Duckels	United Kingdom	The sloop was driven ashore in Gerrans Bay. She was on a voyage from Great Yarmouth, Norfolk to Fowey, Cornwall. She was refloated on 17 January 1854 and towed in to Falmouth, Cornwall.
Grace Darling	United Kingdom	The ship was wrecked at Pembrey, Carmarthenshire. Her crew were rescued.
Harmony	United Kingdom	The ship was wrecked at Pembrey. Her crew were rescued.
Hibernia	United Kingdom	The brigantine was driven ashore and wrecked at Bonchurch, Isle of Wight. Her crew were rescued.
Leo	Stettin	The ship struck a sunken rock and was damaged. She was on a voyage from Newport, Monmouthshire, United Kingdom to Bremen. She put in to Lowestoft, Suffolk, United Kingdom in a leaky condition.
Mary	(United Kingdom of Great Britain and Ireland) Isle of Man	The smack was wrecked on the Churn Rock, in Strangford Lough. Her crew were rescued.
Meteor	United Kingdom	The paddle steamer was run down and sunk in the River Thames at Erith, Kent by the steamship Sylph (United Kingdom). All on board were rescued by the paddle steamer Mars (United Kingdom). Meteor was on a voyage from Blackwall, Middlesex to Gravesend, Kent.
Pearl	United Kingdom	The smack was driven ashore at Saundersfoot, Pembrokeshire. She was on a voyage from Newport, Monmouthshire to Carmarthen.
Rosina	Kingdom of Hanover	The ship ran aground in the Ems and was abandoned. She was on a voyage from Newcastle upon Tyne, Northumberland, United Kingdom to Hamburg. She was refloated on 27 December.
Sophia	United Kingdom	The ship was wrecked at Pembrey with the loss of all hands.
Victoria	United Kingdom	The schooner was run into by a brig and sank at Kingstown. She was on a voyage from Gloucester to Dublin. She was refloated on 1 July 1854 and taken in to Dublin.
Water Lily	United Kingdom	The ship was wrecked on Wood Key, off the Bahamas. She was on a voyage from Jamaica to London.
William and Mary	United Kingdom	The ship was driven ashore at Rosslare, County Wexford. Her crew were rescued by local pilots. She was on a voyage from Porthgain, Pembrokeshire to Wexford.

== 19 December ==
List of shipwrecks: 19 December 1853
Ship	State	Description
Acron Lass	United Kingdom	The ship was driven ashore at Milford Haven, Pembrokeshire.
Active	United Kingdom	The smack was driven ashore at Milford Haven.
Adolfo	Spain	The ship was driven ashore in Dundrum Bay. Her crew were rescued. Adolfo was on a voyage from Seville to Liverpool, Lancashire, United Kingdom. She was declared a total loss.
Agnes	United Kingdom	The brig was driven ashore between "Benhead" and "Nannywater", County Louth with the loss of three of her seven crew. Survivors were rescued by a lifeboat.
Ann and Mary	United Kingdom	The schooner was driven ashore at Milford Haven.
Caravane	France	The barque was driven ashore and wrecked at Curracloe, County Wexford, United Kingdom with the loss of all hands. She was on a voyage from Santander, Spain to Liverpool.
Caroline	United Kingdom	The ship was driven ashore at Dale, Pembrokeshire. She was on a voyage from Cardiff, Glamorgan to Liverpool.
Chatham	United States	The ship ran aground and was wrecked at Drogheda, County Louth with the loss of all but one of her crew. she was on a voyage from Liverpool to Savannah, Georgia.
Dolphin	United Kingdom	The ship was driven ashore at Hartlepool, County Durham.
Eliza	United Kingdom	The schooner was driven ashore at Milford Haven.
Ganabout	United Kingdom	The ship was driven ashore on the coast of Suffolk. She was on a voyage from South Shields, County Durham to Folkestone, Kent. She was refloated and taken in to Lowestoft, Suffolk in a leaky condition.
Kate	United Kingdom	The schooner was driven ashore at Bettystown, County Meath with the loss of a crew member. She was on a voyage from Gloucester to Dublin. Kate was refloated on 2 January 1854 and towed in to Drogheda, County Louth.
Kirwan	United Kingdom	The ship ran aground at Dungarvan, County Waterford and was abandoned by her crew. She was refloated on 2 February 1854 and taken in to Dungarvan.
Lady Sale	United Kingdom	The ship ran aground at Plymouth, Devon. She was on a voyage from Havana, Cuba to Plymouth. She was refloated.
Mary	United Kingdom	The ship struck a sunken rock in Jack Sound and was wrecked. Her crew were rescued. She was on a voyage from Newport, Monmouthshire to Pembroke Dock.
Niagara	United States	The ship was driven ashore at Greenore, County Louth. All on board, 220 passengers plus her crew, were rescued. She was on a voyage from Liverpool, Lancashire, United Kingdom to New York. Niagara was refloated on 11 June 1854 and towed back to Liverpool.
Porto Novo	Portugal	The schooner was driven ashore at Ballycotton, County Cork, United Kingdom. She was on a voyage from Terceira Island, Azores to Cork.
Rambler	United Kingdom	The brig was driven ashore at Milford Haven.
Stag	United Kingdom	The schooner was driven ashore at Blackwater, County Wexford. Her crew were rescued by the Coast Guard using Dennett's rocket apparatus. She was on a voyage from Penzance, Cornwall to Liverpool.
Stratheden	United Kingdom	The ship struck a rock south of Manila, Spanish East Indies and was abandoned.

== 20 December ==
List of shipwrecks: 20 December 1853
Ship	State	Description
Black Prince	United Kingdom	The schooner was driven ashore and wrecked on "Burr Island" with the loss of a crew member. She was on a voyage from London to Dublin.
Bohemian Girl	United Kingdom	The schooner ran aground and sank at Carlingford, County Louth. She was on a voyage from Smyrna, Ottoman Empire to Liverpool, Lancashire.
Collingwood	United Kingdom	The sloop caught fire at Plymouth, Devon and was scuttled.
Dolores	Spain	The schooner was driven ashore at Wexford, United Kingdom. Her crew were rescued. She was on a voyage from Bilbao to Liverpool. She subsequently became a wreck.
Edward Fletcher	United States	The full-rigged ship was abandoned in the Atlantic Ocean. Her crew were rescued by Schoonderloo (Netherlands).
Elizabeth	United Kingdom	The brig was abandoned in the Irish Sea. Her crew were rescued by Robina (France). Elizabeth was on a voyage from Southampton, Hampshire to Liverpool. She was subsequently towed in to Queenstown, County Cork in a sinking condition by the pilot cutter Petrel (United Kingdom).
Frithiof	Norway	The ship was wrecked on the Longsand, in the North Sea off the coast of Essex, United Kingdom. Her crew were rescued. She was on a voyage from Østerisør to Barcelona, Spain.
Kingston	United Kingdom	The ship was driven into a brig and was consequently beached at Milford Haven, Pembrokeshire.
Farmer's Delight	United Kingdom	The smack was driven ashore and wrecked on the Bishops and Clerks Rocks. All on board were rescued. She was on a voyage from Gijón, Spain to Liverpool.
Margaret and Mary	United Kingdom	The ship sank in Aberkelin Bay. Her crew survived. She was on a voyage from Newport, Monmouthshire to Aberdyfi, Merionethshire.
Orion	United Kingdom	The ship was driven ashore at Milford Haven. she was on a voyage from Cork to Newport.
Pajat	Sweden	The schooner ran aground on the Haisborough Sands, in the North Sea off the coast of Norfolk, United Kingdom. She was on a voyage from Kristianstad to Antwerp, Belgium. She was later refloated and put in to Grimsby, Lincolnshire in a leaky condition. She arrived on 23 December.
Pink	United Kingdom	The ship was driven ashore and wrecked at Lossiemouth, Lothian. She was on a voyage from Sunderland, County Durham to Lossiemouth.
Queen Victoria	United Kingdom	The brig was holed by ice in the Schwinge.
Saxony	United Kingdom	The ship was driven ashore at New York, United States. She was on a voyage from New York to Antwerp, Belgium.
Sincerity	United Kingdom	The ship was wrecked at Aberporth, Cardiganshire. Her crew were rescued.
Vriendschap	Netherlands	The ship sprang a leak and sank in the Dogger Bank. Her crew survived. She was on a voyage from Danzig to Groningen.

== 21 December ==
List of shipwrecks: 21 December 1853
Ship	State	Description
Adolfa	Spain	The ship was driven ashore and wrecked at Newcastle, County Down, United Kingdom. She was on a voyage from Seville to Liverpool, Lancashire, United Kingdom.
Amalia	Danzig	The ship was driven ashore at Hela, Prussia. She was on a voyage from Danzig to Liverpool. She was wrecked on 24 December.
Argentina	United Kingdom	The steamship was wrecked on a reef in the River Plate. All on board were rescued. She was on a voyage from Montevideo, Uruguay to Buenos Aires, Argentina.
Cleopatra	Belgium	The ship struck rocks at Dover, Kent, United Kingdom and was damaged. She was on a voyage from Berdyansk, Russia to Antwerp.
Emma Fields	United States	The ship departed from New York for Liverpool. No further trace, presumed foundered with the loss of all hands.
Fingal	United Kingdom	The ship was abandoned in the Atlantic Ocean. Her crew were rescued by Euxine (United Kingdom). Fingal was on a voyage from Quebec City, Province of Canada, British North America to Liverpool.
Loyalist	United Kingdom	The brigantine was abandoned in the Atlantic Ocean. Her crew were rescued by Princeton (United States). Loyalist was on a voyage from New York to London.
Marinus	United Kingdom	The brig ran aground on the Dotwick Sand, in the North Sea off the coast of County Durham.
Three Sisters	United States	The ship sprang a leak and foundered. Her crew were rescued. She was on a voyage from Tongoy, Chile to Baltimore, Maryland.

== 22 December ==
List of shipwrecks: 22 December 1853
Ship	State	Description
Deutschland	Bremen	The ship capsized at Dover, Kent, United Kingdom. She was on a voyage from Bordeaux, Gironde, France to Bremen.
Eglantine	United Kingdom	The ship ran aground on the Black Tail, in the Thames Estuary. She was refloated and taken in to Gravesend, Kent.
Flora	United Kingdom	The ship ran aground and was severely damaged at Aveiro, Portugal. Her crew were rescued.
Harmony	(United Kingdom of Great Britain and Ireland) Jersey	The ship was driven ashore at Portland, Dorset. She was refloated and taken in to Weymouth, Dorset.
Jantje Manninga	Stettin	The galiot ran aground on the Longsand, in the North Sea off the coast of Essex, United Kingdom. She was on a voyage from Stettin to Bordeaux. She was refloated and taken in to Whitstable, Kent.
Perseverance	United Kingdom	The steamship foundered in the English Channel off Bonchurch, Isle of Wight. Her crew were rescued. She was on a voyage from London to the River Severn.
Spray	(United Kingdom of Great Britain and Ireland) British North America	The ship was wrecked at "Jedour". She was on a voyage from Souris, Prince Edward Island to Saint John, New Brunswick.
Tom Banks	United Kingdom	The schooner was in collision with another vessel and sank off the Crow Rock, in the Irish Sea. Her crew were rescued. She was on a voyage from Barrow-in-Furness, Lancashire to Newport, Monmouthshire.

== 23 December ==
List of shipwrecks: 23 December 1853
Ship	State	Description
Clemence	Belgium	The brigantine foundered in the Atlantic Ocean. Her crew were rescued by the barque Borneo (Netherlands). Clemence was on a voyage from Liverpool, Lancashire, United Kingdom to Ostend, West Flanders.
Gladiator	United Kingdom	The brig was abandoned in the Atlantic Ocean. Twelve people were rescued by Eleanor (United Kingdom). Gladiator was on a voyage from Montreal, Province of Canada, British North America to Gloucester.
Lady Charlotte	United Kingdom	The ship foundered in the Atlantic Ocean. Her crew were rescued by Maranon (Flag unknown_. Lady Charlotte was on a voyage from Mauritius to Falmouth, Cornwall.
Rosina	United Kingdom	The ship ran aground off Delfzijl, Groningen, Netherlands. She was on a voyage from Newcastle upon Tyne, Northumberland to Abruka, Russia.
Thomas and Anne	United Kingdom	The sloop was driven ashore near Caister-on-Sea, Norfolk. She was on a voyage from East Stockwith, Lincolnshire to London.
Tusket	(United Kingdom of Great Britain and Ireland) British North America	The schooner capsized in the Atlantic Ocean with the loss of all but one of her crew. The survivor was taken off the wreck on 25 December by Charles (United Kingdom). Tusket was on a voyage from Yarmouth, Nova Scotia to the West Indies.
Vectis	United Kingdom	The steamship was driven ashore at Livorno, Grand Duchy of Tuscany. She was refloated.
Yar	United Kingdom	The ship was driven ashore at Sunderland, County Durham. She was on a voyage from Great Yarmouth, Norfolk to Sunderland.

== 24 December ==
List of shipwrecks: 24 December 1853
Ship	State	Description
Condor	United States	The full-rigged ship was abandoned in the Atlantic Ocean. All 28 people on board were rescued by Schoonderloo (Netherlands).
Eagle	(United Kingdom of Great Britain and Ireland) British North America	The ship was driven ashore and wrecked at Owls Head, Nova Scotia.
Grace McVea	United Kingdom	The ship was abandoned in the Atlantic Ocean. Her crew were rescued by Maria (Bremen). Grace McVea was on a voyage from Quebec City, Province of Canada, British North America to the Clyde.
Jenny Lind	United Kingdom	The ship sprang a leak and was beached in Twofold Bay.
Mary Anne	(United Kingdom of Great Britain and Ireland) British North America	The ship was driven ashore at Yarmouth, Nova Scotia, where she subsequently became a wreck. She was on a voyage from Saint John, New Brunswick to Halifax, Nova Scotia.
Menai Packet	United Kingdom	The sloop was in collision with the steamship Mars (United Kingdom) and sank in the River Mersey.
Reindeer	(United Kingdom of Great Britain and Ireland) British North America	The ship struck the Sambule Rock, north west of Guernsey, Channel Islands and sank with the loss of two of her crew. She was on a voyage from Montevideo, Uruguay to London.
Salus	United States	The ship was driven ashore and wrecked at Yarmouth, Nova Scotia. Her crew were rescued. She was on a voyage from Boston, Massachusetts to Mahone Bay.
Sophia	United Kingdom	The ship was blown out to sea from São Miguel Island, Azores. She put in to Faial Island, where she was subsequently condemned.
Victor	United Kingdom	The brig was dismasted and abandoned on West Caicos, Caicos Islands. Her crew were rescued. She was on a voyage from the Turks Islands to New York, United States.
Water Rose	(United Kingdom of Great Britain and Ireland) British North America	The schooner capsized in the Atlantic Ocean with the loss of two of her crew. Survivors were rescued on 24 January by the full-rigged ship Cornelia (Spain). Water Rose was on a voyage from Shelburne, Nova Scotia to the West Indies.

== 25 December ==
List of shipwrecks: 25 December 1853
Ship	State	Description
Charles and Jane	United States	The ship ran aground in the Stanford Channel. She was on a voyage from Newcastle upon Tyne, Northumberland, United Kingdom to New York. She was refloated and put in to Plymouth, Devon, United Kingdom in a leaky condition.
Dorothea	Sweden	The ship ran aground on the Haisborough Sand, in the North Sea off the coast of Norfolk, United Kingdom. She was on a voyage from Visby to London, United Kingdom. She was refloated and put in to Lowestoft, Suffolk, United Kingdom in a leaky condition.
Ida	Netherlands	The galiot sprang a leak and was beached at Figueira da Foz, Portugal. Her crew were rescued. She was on a voyage from Newcastle upon Tyne to Porto, Portugal.
Maria Eliza	Denmark	The ship was driven ashore and wrecked at the mouth of the Agger Canal. She was on a voyage from Newcastle upon Tyne to "Stouer".
No Joke	(United Kingdom of Great Britain and Ireland) Jersey	The ship ran aground on the Margate Sand, off the coast of Kent. She was on a voyage from Saint-Malo, Ille-et-Vilaine to London. She was refloated and resumed her voyage.
Prince Albert	United Kingdom	The ship struck the Bishop Rock, Isles of Scilly and was damaged. She put in to the Isles of Scilly in a leaky condition.

== 26 December ==
List of shipwrecks: 26 December 1853
Ship	State	Description
Commerce	United States	The ship was abandoned in the Atlantic Ocean. All on board were rescued by Andrew Foster (United States). Commerce was on a voyage from New York to London, United Kingdom.
Marie Alphonsine	Belgium	The ship was wrecked on the Pierre Percée Rocks, off the coast of Loire-Inférieure, France. Her crew were rescued.
Marie Elisa	Denmark	The ship was driven ashore and wrecked at the entrance to the Agger Canal. She was on a voyage from Newcastle upon Tyne, Northumberland, United Kingdom to Struer.
Samuel and Ann	United Kingdom	The ship ran aground and was damaged on the South Gar, in the North Sea off the coast of Yorkshire. She was refloated with the assistance of the steamship Albion (United Kingdom) and towed in to Middlesbrough, Yorkshire.
Statesman	United Kingdom	The ship caught fire off Point Henry, Victoria and was scuttled. She was later refloated.
Thirsk Trader	United Kingdom	The ship ran aground on the South Gar. She was refloated with the assistance of the steamship Star (United Kingdom and towed in to Middlesbrough in a severely leaky condition.

== 27 December ==
List of shipwrecks: 27 December 1853
Ship	State	Description
Amy Louisa	United Kingdom	The ship ran aground on the Longsand, in the North Sea off the coast of Essex. She was on a voyage from Alloa, Clackmannanshire to Mauritius. She was refloated and put in to Deal, Kent.
Constellation	United States	The ship was damaged by fire at New York.
Cygnet	United Kingdom	The brig was wrecked on the Herd Sand, in the North Sea off the coast of County Durham. Her crew were rescued by the South Shields Lifeboat. She was on a voyage from South Shields, County Durham to London.
Daisy	United Kingdom	The ship was wrecked on the Long Sand. She was on a voyage from Boston, Lincolnshire to London.
Great Republic	United States	The extreme clipper was damaged by fire at New York. She was declared a total loss.
Hirondelle	United Kingdom	The schooner was in collision with the brig Guilhermina (Portugal) and sank in the English Channel 21 nautical miles (39 km) west south west of Dungeness, Kent. Her crew were rescued by Guilhermina. The schooner was on a voyage from Exeter, Devon to Middlesbrough, Yorkshire.
Joseph Walker	United States	The ship was destroyed by fire at New York.
New York Packet	Belgium	The barque was run into by the burning White Squall (United States) and was severely damaged at New York. Her rigging had to be cut away to prevent her catching fire.
Princess Royal	United Kingdom	The smack was driven ashore and wrecked at Milford Haven, Pembrokeshire. Her crew were rescued.
Rebecca Lang	United Kingdom	The schooner was driven ashore and wrecked at Gun Point, Cornwall with the loss of two of her crew. She was refloated on 31 December and taken in to Padstow, Cornwall in a severely damaged condition.
Stamboul	United Kingdom	The ship was driven ashore at "San Pietro Malamacco", Kingdom of Lombardy–Venetia. She was on a voyage from Great Yarmouth, Norfolk to Venice, Kingdom of Lombardy–Venetia. She was refloated on 7 January 1854 and taken in to Venice.
Theresa	United Kingdom	The schooner was driven ashore at "Porto Plata", Dominican Republic.
White Squall	United States	The extreme clipper was severely damaged by fire at New York. She was subsequently rebuilt as a barque.

== 28 December ==
List of shipwrecks: 28 December 1853
Ship	State	Description
Alliance	United Kingdom	The brig was driven ashore between Lowestoft and Corton, Suffolk. Her crew were rescued. She was on a voyage from Harwich, Essex to Seaham, County Durham. Alliance was refloated on 30 December and taken in to Lowestoft.
Ann	United Kingdom	The ship sprang a leak and was run ashore at Flamborough Head, Yorkshire. She was on a voyage from Hartlepool, County Durham to London. She was a total loss.
Buoy Yacht	United Kingdom	The schooner was driven ashore at Great Yarmouth, Norfolk.
Celerity	United Kingdom	The sloop was driven ashore between Lowestoft and Corton. Her crew were rescued. She was on a voyage from Hull, Yorkshire to London.
Eva	United Kingdom	The paddle steamer foundered off the Kish Bank, in the Irish Sea with the loss of eleven lives. Seven crew were rescued by the fishing smack Emerald (United Kingdom). Eva was on her maiden voyage from the Greenock, Renfrewshire to Melbourne, Victoria.
Fly	United Kingdom	The brig was driven ashore between Lowestoft and Corton. Her crew were rescued. She was on a voyage from London to Seaham. Fly was refloated on 15 February 1854.
Herald	United Kingdom	The schooner was driven ashore in the Isles of Scilly. She was refloated the next day.
James	United Kingdom	The ship was driven ashore at Lowestoft. She was refloated and taken in to Lowestoft.
Juliana	United Kingdom	The galiot was driven ashore and wrecked near Corton, Suffolk. Her crew were rescued. She was on a voyage from South Shields, County Durham to Wells-next-the-Sea, Norfolk.
Mount Charles	United Kingdom	The schooner struck the Stones reef off Godrevy Island, Cornwall and sank. Her crew survived.
Panope	France	The schooner was driven ashore at Lowestoft. She was on a voyage from Blyth, Northumberland, United Kingdom to Caen, Calvados. She was refloated and taken in to Lowestoft.
Patriota	Spain	The ship was in collision with the steamship Genova (United Kingdom) and foundered in the Strait of Gibraltar. Her crew were rescued. She was on a voyage from Ferrol to Málaga.
Quebec	United Kingdom	The barque ran aground on Friar's Bank, in the Irish Sea off the coast of Anglesey. She was on a voyage from Danzig to Liverpool, Lancashire.
Reindeer	United Kingdom	The schooner was lost in the Atlantic Ocean. Her crew were rescued. She was on a voyage from Attakapas, Louisiana to Amboy, New Jersey.
Rose	United Kingdom	The schooner was driven ashore at Passage West, County Cork. She was refloated.
Rose	United Kingdom	The barque was driven ashore and wrecked at Liverpool, Nova Scotia, British North America.
Samuel	United Kingdom	The schooner was driven ashore and wrecked near Corton. Her crew were rescued.
Snipe	United Kingdom	The brig was driven ashore and wrecked between Lowestoft and Corton.
Syria	United States	The ship departed from Edgartown, Massachusetts. No further trace, presumed foundered with the loss of all hands.
Tam o'Shanter	United States	The clipper was abandoned in the Atlantic Ocean. All on board were rescued by the schooner Fides and the full-rigged ship Wellfleet (both United States). Tam o'Shanter was on a voyage from Calcutta, India to Boston, Massachusetts.
Thomas and Ann	United Kingdom	The ship was driven ashore at Caister-on-Sea, Norfolk. She was refloated and taken in to Great Yarmouth.
Yarborough	United Kingdom	The Yorkshire Billyboy was driven ashore near Corton. Her crew were rescued. She was on a voyage from South Shields to Maldon, Essex.
Vigilant	United Kingdom	The ship was driven ashore at Brenkemer's Hoff, in the Weser. She was on a voyage from Newport, Monmouthshire to Bremen. She was refloated on 28 December and taken in to Bremerhaven.
William	United Kingdom	The ship was driven ashore east of Bilbao, Spain. Her crew were rescued. She was on a voyage from Falmouth, Cornwall to "Santina". She was refloated on 31 December and taken in to Bilbao.

== 29 December ==
List of shipwrecks: 29 December 1853
Ship	State	Description
Anna Maria	Russia	The galiot was wrecked near Vila do Conde, Portugal. Her crew were rescued. She was on a voyage from Riga to Porto, Portugal.
Jessie	United Kingdom	The ship was beached at Dartmouth, Devon. She was on a voyage from Newport, Monmouthshire to Southampton, Hampshire.
Menodora	United Kingdom	The ship ran aground on the Jenny Ground Rocks, on the Sussex coast between Brighton and Shoreham-by-Sea. She was on a voyage from Hartlepool, County Durham to Shoreham-by-Sea. She was refloated and taken in to Shoreham-by-Sea in a leaky condition.
Priscilla	United Kingdom	The ship was abandoned in the Atlantic Ocean. Her crew were rescued by Peerless (United Kingdom). Priscilla was on a voyage from Philadelphia, Pennsylvania, United States to Liverpool, Lancashire.
Snowdon Lassie	United Kingdom	The ship was driven ashore at Breaksea Point, Glamorgan. She was on a voyage from Cardiff, Glamorgan to Dublin.
Quebec	United Kingdom	The barque ran aground at Beaumaris, Anglesey.

== 30 December ==
List of shipwrecks: 30 December 1853
Ship	State	Description
Banker's Daughter	United Kingdom	The full-rigged ship was lost in the Maldive Islands. Her crew were rescued. She was on a voyage from Geelong, Victoria to Bombay, India.
Candace	United Kingdom	The ship ran aground at Queenstown, County Cork. She was on a voyage from Callao, Peru to Queenstown.
Charlotte Marie	United States	The ship was driven ashore at New York City. She was on a voyage from New York City to Havre de Grâce, Seine-Inférieure, France. She was refloated.
Edouard Marie	Netherlands	The ship was driven ashore at Smiths Point, New York, United States.
Effort	United Kingdom	The ship ran aground on the Holme Sand, in the North Sea off the coast of Suffolk. She was on a voyage from Southampton, Hampshire to Sunderland, County Durham. She was refloated and taken in to Lowestoft, Suffolk.
Helen Sophia	United Kingdom	The ship was driven ashore at Havre de Grâce, Seine-Inférieure, France. She was on a voyage from South Shields, County Durham to Caen, Calvados, France.
Hendrick	Netherlands	The ship was driven ashore near Renesse, Zeeland. She was on a voyage from Batavia, Netherlands East Indies to Rotterdam, South Holland.
Hope	United Kingdom	The ship was abandoned in the Pacific Ocean. All on board were rescued. She was on a voyage from the Clyde to Melbourne, Victoria.
HMS Medea	Royal Navy	The paddle sloop ran aground off Spurn Point, Yorkshire. She was refloated.
Mersey	United Kingdom	The schooner ran aground on the Longsand, in the North Sea off the coast of Essex. She was on a voyage from Arbroath, Forfarshire to London. She was refloated and taken in to Wivenhoe, Essex.
Oliver	France	The ship ran aground off Boulogne, Pas-de-Calais, France. She was on a voyage from London, United Kingdom to Caen.
Rose	United Kingdom	The schooner was driven ashore at Waterford. She was refloated.
Rose Campbell	United Kingdom	The barque was wrecked near Liverpool, Nova Scotia, British North America.
Singapore	United States	The ship was wrecked near Liverpool, Nova Scotia.
Staffordshire	United States	The clipper ship struck Blonde Rock, off Seal Island, Nova Scotia and sank with the loss of 170 lives. There were 33 survivors. She was on a voyage from Liverpool, Lancashire, United Kingdom to Boston, Massachusetts.
Sophia	United Kingdom	The brigantine was wrecked on the West Hoyle Bank, in Liverpool Bay with the loss of all hands.

== 31 December ==
List of shipwrecks: 31 December 1853
Ship	State	Description
Advance	United States	The ship was abandoned in the Atlantic Ocean. Her crew were rescued by Falcon (United Kingdom). Advance was on a voyage from Boston, Massachusetts to Rio de la Hacha, Republic of New Granada.
Annette	Norway	The ship ran aground on the Goodwin Sands, Kent, United Kingdom. She was on a voyage from St. Ubes, Portugal to Stavanger. She was refloated but consequently sank.
Christina	United Kingdom	The ship struck the Wheaton Rock then the Blenick Rock and was severely damaged. She was on a voyage from Sligo to Liverpool, Lancashire.
Courier	United Kingdom	The brig was wrecked on Scroby Sands, Norfolk. Her crew were rescued. She was on a voyage from Middlesbrough, Yorkshire to Inverness.
Electricity	United Kingdom	The ship was driven ashore at Cape de Gatt, Spain. Her crew were rescued. She was on a voyage from Sunderland, County Durham to Barcelona, Spain.
Ellon	United Kingdom	The schooner was driven ashore and severely damaged near Gravelines, Nord, France. She was on a voyage from London to Dunkirk, Nord.
Emma	Bremen	The ship was driven ashore near Campduin, North Holland, Netherlands with the loss of six of her crew. She was on a voyage from Baltimore, Maryland, United States to Amsterdam, North Holland.
Margaret Price	United Kingdom	The ship was lost at "Little Hope", United States. She was on a voyage from Sydney, Nova Scotia, British North America to Augusta, Georgia, United States.
Matilda	United Kingdom	The ship was in collision with a brig and was run ashore at Killard Point, County Louth. She was on a voyage from Wick, Caithness to Dublin. She was refloated.
Pearl	United States	The steamship sank in the Mississippi River with the loss of eighteen lives.
Pekin	France	The chasse-marée foundered off Great Yarmouth, Norfolk, United Kingdom. All eight people on board took to a boat; they were rescued by Varoon (United Kingdom). Peakin was on a voyage from Hartlepool, County Durham, United Kingdom to L'Orient, Morbihan.
Transit	United Kingdom	The ship was driven ashore at Whitford Point, Glamorgan. She was refloated and towed in to Neath, Glamorgan.
William Whitty	United Kingdom	The schooner was driven ashore and wrecked at Formby, Lancashire. Her crew were rescued. She was on a voyage from Pentewan, Cornwall to Liverpool, Lancashire.

== Unknown date ==
List of shipwrecks: Unknown date in December 1853
Ship	State	Description
Adelia	United Kingdom	The ship was wrecked in Dundrum Bay. She was on a voyage from Seville, Spain to Liverpool, Lancashire.
Andromaque	France	The barque foundered in the Atlantic Ocean before 17 December. Her crew were rescued by Clemence (Belgium). Andromaque was on a voyage from Marseille, Bouches-du-Rhône to Nantes, Loire-Inférieure.
Anetta Fossina	Netherlands	The ship was driven ashore near Brouwershaven, Zeeland before 22 December. She was on a voyage from Newcastle upon Tyne, Northumberland, United Kingdom to Antwerp, Belgium. She was refloated but consequently had to be beached at Renesse, Zeeland.
Anoromague	France	The ship foundered off the coast of Portugal.
Bellengeleich	United Kingdom	The ship was driven ashore on Green Island, British North America and was abandoned by her crew. She was on a voyage from Montreal, Province of Canada, British North America to Liverpool.
Black Prince	United Kingdom	The ship was driven ashore and wrecked near Belfast, County Antrim with the loss of a crew member. She was on a voyage from London to Belfast.
Bohemian Lass	United Kingdom	The schooner was driven ashore and wrecked at Carlingford, County Louth. Her crew were rescued. She was on a voyage from Smyrna, Ottoman Empire to Liverpool. Bohemian Lass was refloated on 30 December.
Catherina	Russia	The ship was wrecked off "Sernasen" before 3 December. She was on a voyage from Ventspils to Riga.
Catherina	(flag) Netherlands	The ship was wrecked at "Egniada", Ottoman Empire before 14 December. She was on a voyage from the Danube to a Dutch port.
Charles and Jane	United States	The ship was driven ashore. She was on a voyage from Newcastle upon Tyne to New York. She was refloated and put in to Plymouth, Devon, United Kingdom on 25 December in a severely leaky condition.
Charles de Wolff	United Kingdom	The brig was driven ashore on Hog Island, New York She was on a voyage from New York to Saint John, New Brunswick. She was refloated on 12 December and towed in to New York.
Charles Fox Bennett	United Kingdom	The ship was driven ashore and wrecked at Port Augusta, South Australia. Her crew were rescued. She was on a voyage from Liverpool to Melbourne, Victoria.
Chatham	United Kingdom	The ship was wrecked at Drogheda, County Louth.
Clutha	United Kingdom	The ship was driven ashore and wrecked on "Gorse Island", British North America. She was on a voyage from Quebec City, Province of Canada to the Clyde.
Concordia	United Kingdom	The ship was driven ashore on "Crane Island", British North America. She was on a voyage from Quebec City to Newport, Monmouthshire.
Cottoner	Malta	The brig was driven into an Ottoman brig in the Dardanelles.
Electric	United Kingdom	The ship was abandoned off Rivière-du-Loup, Province of Canada. She was on a voyage from Quebec City to Bideford, Devon.
Ernest	France	The ship departed from Newcastle upon Tyne for Bordeaux, Gironde. Subsequently foundered in the Bay of Biscay with the presumed loss of all hands.
Figaro	Belgium	The ship was wrecked at Constantinople, Ottoman Empire before 25 December.
François	France	The ship was wrecked in the Pertuis de Manmasson, off the coast of Charente-Inférieure. She was on a voyage from Africa to Bordeaux.
Gauntlet	United Kingdom	The brig was driven ashore and wrecked on "Rugged Island", United States.
Goldseeker	(United Kingdom of Great Britain and Ireland) Victoria	The ship was wrecked on King Island, Van Diemen's Land. She was on a voyage from Fremantle, Swan River Colony to Melbourne.
Haabet	Norway	The ship was driven ashore in the Bosphorus. She was refloated.
Harmony	United Kingdom	The ship was wrecked in Chaleur Bay.
Helen	United Kingdom	The ship was wrecked at "Carabourna", Ottoman Empire before 14 December. She was on a voyage from Berdyansk, Russia to Trieste.
Hylton Maid	United Kingdom	The ship was driven ashore at Constantinople. She was refloated on 29 December.
Invincible	United Kingdom	The ship was driven ashore and wrecked near Algeciras, Spain before 12 December. She was on a voyage from Palermo, Sicily to Liverpool.
Johanna Julianna	Netherlands	The ship was wrecked at "Soundere", Ottoman Empire before 31 December. Her crew were rescued. She was on a voyage from Amsterdam, North Holland to Constantinople, Ottoman Emppire.
Juno	United Kingdom	The ship was driven ashore on "Crane Island".
Lawrie	United Kingdom	The ship was wrecked near La Teste-de-Buch, Gironde, France.
Leipzig	Bremen	The steamship ran aground in the Weser 6 nautical miles (11 km) downstream of Bremerhaven. She was refloated on 15 January and taken in to Bremerhaven.
Leonora	United Kingdom	The ship foundered in the Atlantic Ocean. Her eighteen crew were rescued by Doris (United Kingdom). Leonora was on a voyage from Demerara, British Guiana to Liverpool.
Lord Western	United Kingdom	The ship was abandoned in Nootka Sound on or before 4 December. Her crew were rescued. She was on a voyage from Vancouver Island to San Francisco, California, United States.
Maria	France	The ship was lost at the entrance to the English Channel in late December. She was on a voyage from Adra, Spain to Dunkirk, Nord.
Marie Honore	France	The chasse-marée was driven ashore. She was on a voyage from Quimper, Finistère to Bordeaux Gironde.
Mary Coles	United Kingdom	The ship foundered off the coast of Cornwall on or before 3 December.
Menai Packet	United Kingdom	The ship was run down by the steamship Mars (United Kingdom) and sank in the River Mersey off New Brighton, Cheshire. She was refloated on 29 December.
Mountain Maid	United Kingdom	The ship was abandoned at sea. Her crew were rescued by Orion (France). Mountain Maid was on a voyage from Limerick to London.
Nerée	France	The ship ran aground at Guadeloupe and was abandoned. She was on a voyage from Havre de Grâce, Seine-Inférieure to Guadeloupe.
Novo Restorador	Portugal	The ship was wrecked at Vigo, Spain. She was on a voyage from London to Porto.
Orleans	United States	The ship was wrecked on Botel Tobago, Formosa. Her crew were rescued. She was on a voyage from Valparaíso, Chile to Shanghai, China.
Oscar	(United Kingdom of Great Britain and Ireland) British North America	The brig was wrecked in the Bahamas. Her crew were rescued.
Ottawa	(United Kingdom of Great Britain and Ireland) British North America	The ship was driven ashore on "Crane Island".
Porto Rico	United States	The brigantine was abandoned in the Atlantic Ocean before 5 December.
Queen of Scotland	United Kingdom	The paddle steamer was driven ashore at Glückstadt, Duchy of Schleswig. She was refloated on 17 December.
Rankie	United Kingdom	The ship was driven ashore on Green Island. She was on a voyage from Quebec City to Liverpool.
Rattler	United States	The full-rigged ship was driven ashore in the Currituck Inlet before 14 December and subsequently became a wreck.
Roman	United States	The ship was abandoned in the Atlantic Ocean. Her crew were rescued by R. B. Foster and William Price (both United States). Roman was on a voyage from Canton, China to New York.
Rose	United Kingdom	The schooner was driven ashore near Waterford.
Royal William	United Kingdom	The steamship ran aground at Liverpool. She was on a voyage from Dublin to Liverpool. She was refloated on 7 December.
Sacrée Familie	France	The ship was wrecked in the Îles d'Hyères, Var.
Salacia	United Kingdom	The ship was driven ashore and wrecked at Dungarvan, County Waterford before 21 December. She was on a voyage from Cork to Bristol, Gloucestershire.
San Fortunata	Kingdom of Sardinia	The ship was wrecked at "Egniada" before 14 December. She was on a voyage from the Danube to Genoa.
Trial	United Kingdom	The ship was driven ashore and wrecked at Dungarvan before 21 December.
Undine	United Kingdom	The ship was wrecked at Cárdenas, Cuba before 14 December.
Wilberforce	United Kingdom	The brig was driven ashore in the Gut of Canso before 22 December. She was refloated and taken in to Providence, Nova Scotia, British North America.
William	United Kingdom	The ship was abandoned at Kemi, Grand Duchy of Finland before 17 December. She was on a voyage from Pori, Grand Duchy of Finland to London.
Young Queen	United Kingdom	The barque was wrecked on the Bird Rock, off Crooked Island, Bahamas. Her crew survived. She was on a voyage from St. Jago de Cuba, Cuba to Swansea, Glamorgan.
