= USRC Crawford =

USRC Crawford may refer to more than one ship of the United States Revenue-Marine:

- USRC Crawford (1830), a revenue cutter in commission from 1830 to 1835
- USRC Jefferson (1832), a revenue cutter in commission from 1833 to 1847, renamed USRC Crawford in April 1839
- USRC Crawford (1849), a revenue cutter in commission from 1849 to 1869
- USS Nansemond (1862), a U.S. Navy ship transferred to the Revenue Cutter Service in 1865 and renamed USRC W.H. Crawford in 1873
