= List of things named after Alexander Hamilton =

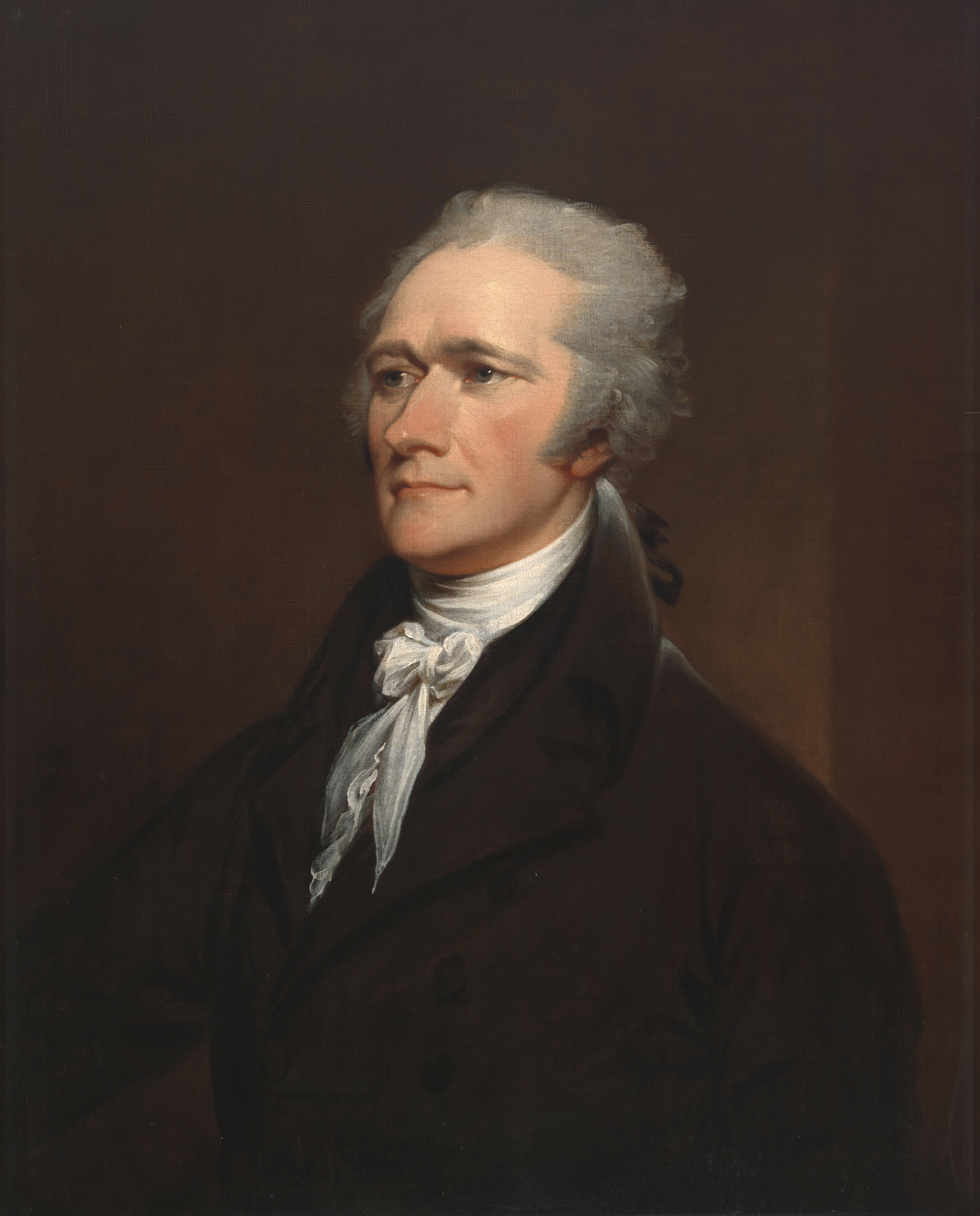
Posthumous Portrait by John Trumbull, c. 1806

Since the death of Alexander Hamilton on July 12, 1804, numerous things have been named after him, including unit lineage, vessels, schools, towns, buildings, public works and art, and geographic sites.

== Lineage ==
- The lineage of the New York Provincial Company of Artillery has been perpetuated in a series of units nicknamed "Hamilton's Own." It was carried by the 5th Field Artillery Regiment.

== Vessels ==
=== Steamers ===
- PS Alexander Hamilton was completed in 1924. When she retired from service as a passenger steamboat in 1971, she was one of the last operating sidewheel steamboats in the United States. She was the last sidewheeler to traverse the Hudson River.

=== United States Coast Guard ===
- USRC Hamilton (1830), the fastest Morris-Taney-class cutter, was operated out of Boston for much of her career. She became famous for rescues and saving property. A song titled "The Cutter Hamilton Quick step" was written in November 1839. The vessel was lost in a gale in 1853.
- USS Alexander Hamilton (1871) was a revenue cutter in service from 1871 to 1906 and a participant in the Spanish–American War.
- USS Vicksburg (PG-11) was renamed to Alexander Hamilton in 1922 after being transferred to the Coast Guard a year earlier. She was renamed to Beta between 1935 and 1936.
- USCGC Alexander Hamilton was a Treasury-class cutter launched in 1937 and stricken in January 1942 after an attack by Germany. She was the Coast Guard's first loss in World War II.
- USCGC Hamilton (WHEC-715) was a cutter in service from 1967 to 2011 when she was transferred to the Philippine Navy.
- USCGC Hamilton (WMSL-753) is a Legend-class cutter commissioned in 2014.

=== United States Navy ===
A number of vessels in the United States Navy have borne the designation USS Hamilton, though some have been named for other men. The USS Alexander Hamilton (SSBN-617) was the second Lafayette-class nuclear-powered fleet ballistic missile submarine.

== Neighborhoods ==
Hamilton Heights, Manhattan

It is the neighborhood where Alexander Hamilton built his country home, George Gershwin wrote his first hit, a young Norman Rockwell discovered he liked to draw, and Ralph Ellison wrote Invisible Man.

== Houses ==
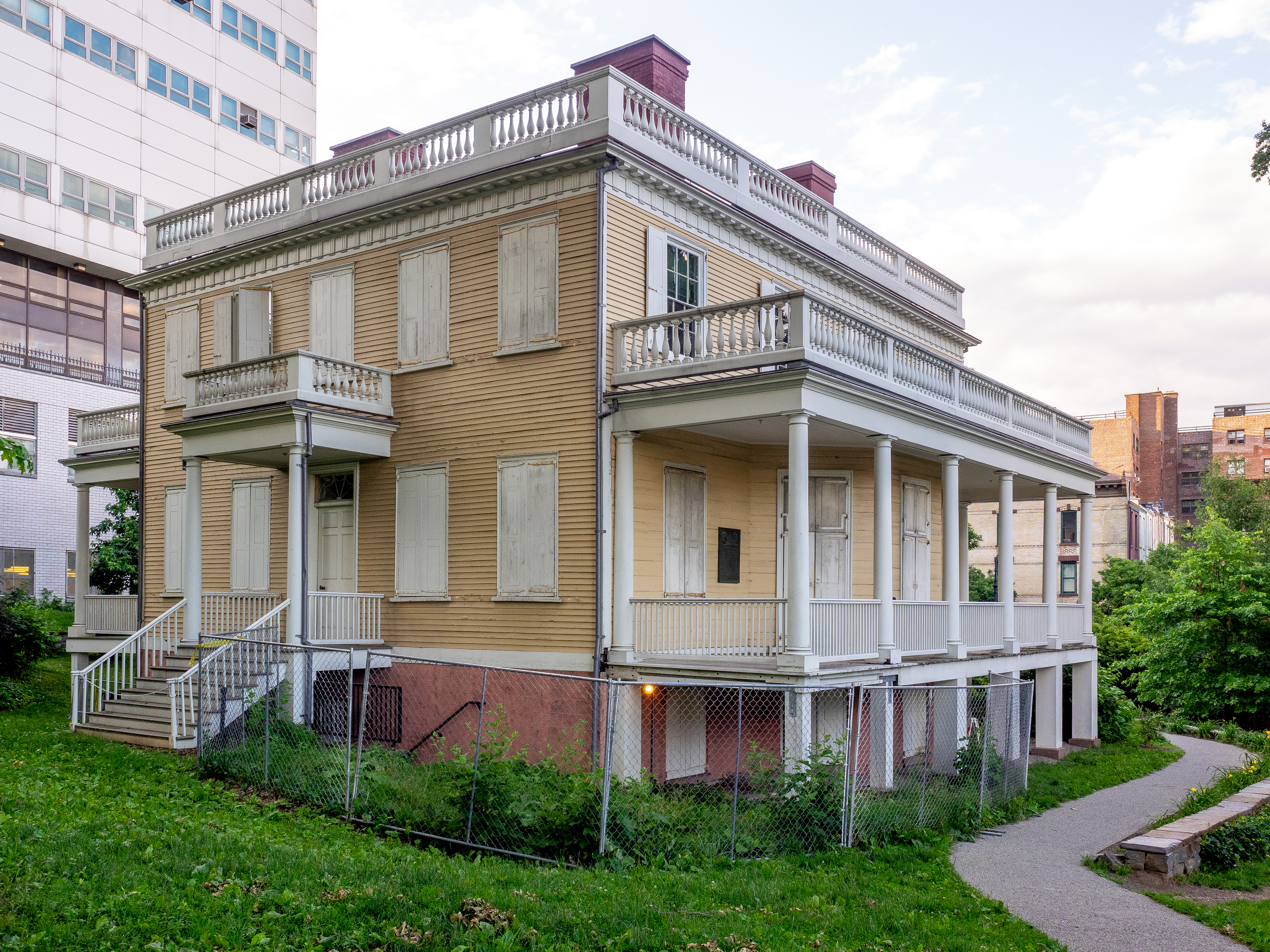
The Hamilton Grange National Memorial in 2019

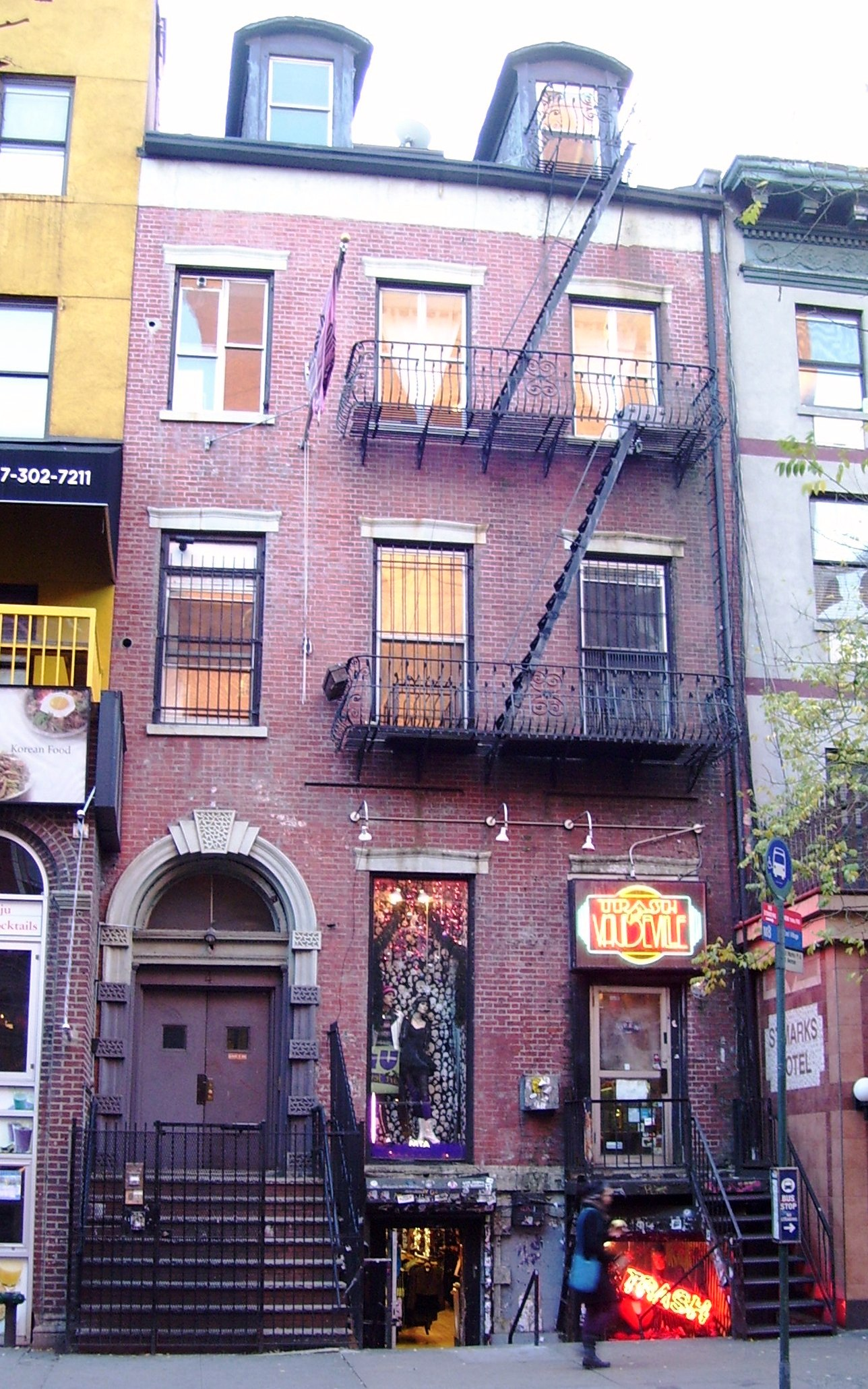
The Hamilton-Holly House in 2010

- The Hamilton Grange National Memorial is the only house Hamilton owned. The mansion was built on his 32-acre country estate in Hamilton Heights, Manhattan and was completed in 1802. The mansion remained in the family until 1833 when his widow sold it to real estate developer Thomas E. Davis.
- Elizabeth used part of the proceeds from the Grange estate to purchase a new townhouse from Davis, the Hamilton-Holly House. Elizabeth lived in it with her grown children Alexander and Eliza, and their spouses until 1843.

== Colleges and universities ==
- The main classroom building for the humanities at Columbia University is Hamilton Hall. The university's student group for Reserve Officers' Training Corps cadets and Marine officer candidates is named the Alexander Hamilton Society.
- Hamilton served as one of the first trustees of the Hamilton-Oneida Academy, which was renamed to Hamilton College in 1812 after receiving a college charter.
- The main administration building of the United States Coast Guard Academy in New London, Connecticut is named Hamilton Hall to commemorate Hamilton's creation of the United States Revenue Cutter Service, one of the predecessors to the Coast Guard.

== Schools ==
- Alexander Hamilton High School in Los Angeles
- Alexander Hamilton Jr./Sr. High School
- Alexander Hamilton High School in Brooklyn
- Alexander Hamilton High School in Milwaukee

== Buildings and public work ==
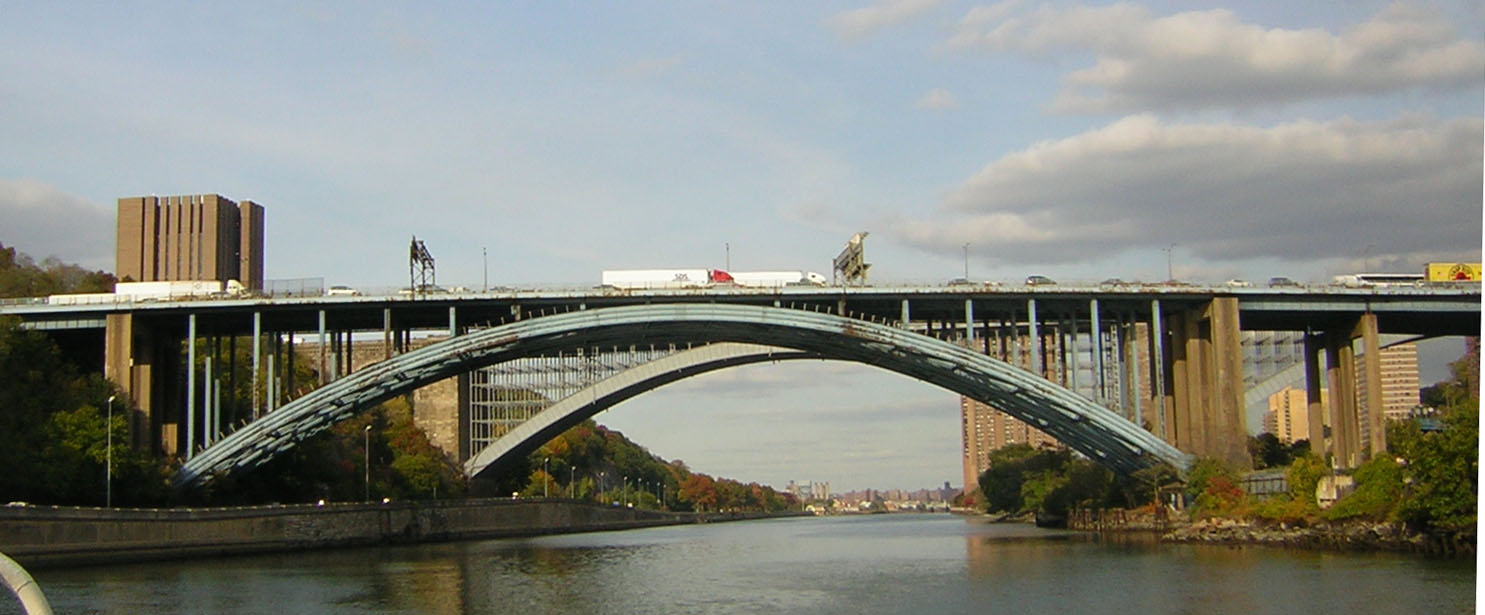
A view of the Alexander Hamilton Bridge from the south

- The Salem, Massachusetts social space Hamilton Hall was built in 1805.
- Fort Hamilton, the fourth oldest installation in the United States, was built in 1831.
- Alexander Hamilton Bridge, an eight-lane steel arch bridge that carries traffic over the Harlem River, opened near his former Grange estate on January 15, 1963.
- In 1990, a New York government building was renamed to the Alexander Hamilton U.S. Custom House.
- At Hamilton's birthplace in Charlestown, Nevis, the Alexander Hamilton Museum was rebuilt on the foundations of the house where Hamilton was once believed to have been born and lived during his childhood.

== Statues ==
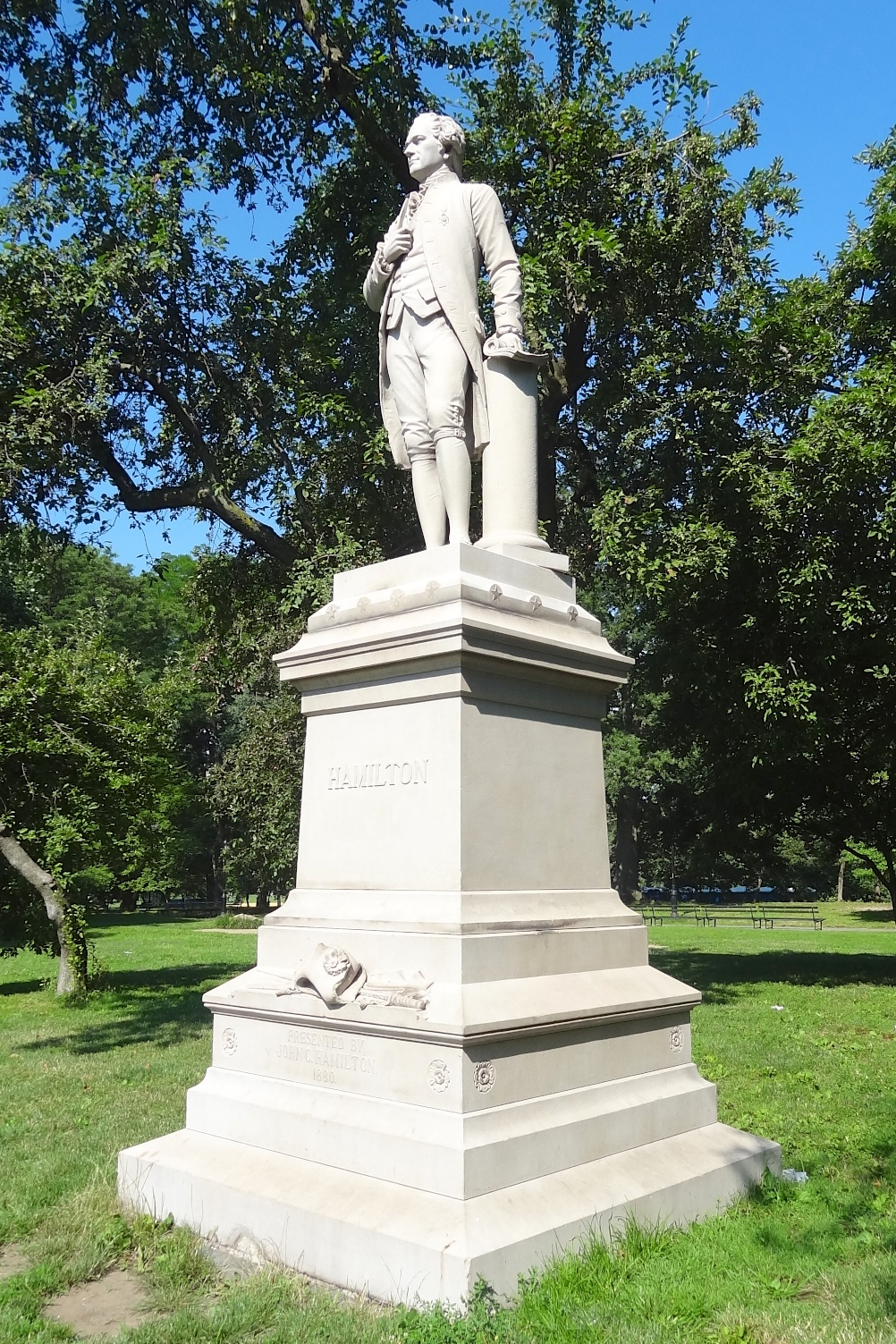
Statue of Alexander Hamilton in Central Park

- In 1880, Hamilton's son John Church Hamilton commissioned Carl Conrads to sculpt a granite statue, now located in Central Park, New York City. Conrads used the bust created around 1794 by the sculptor Giuseppe Ceracchi as a model for the head.
- The Hamilton Club in Brooklyn, New York City commissioned William Ordway Partridge to cast a bronze statue of Hamilton. It was completed in 1892 for exhibition at the World's Columbian Exposition and later installed in front of the club on the corner of Remsen and Clinton Streets in 1893. The club was absorbed by another and the building was demolished; the statue was removed in 1936 to the Hamilton Grange National Memorial in Manhattan. After the memorial relocated in 2007, the statue remained at that location.
- A bronze statue of Hamilton by Franklin Simmons, dated 1905–06, overlooks the Great Falls of the Passaic River at Paterson Great Falls National Historical Park in New Jersey.
- In Washington, D.C., the south terrace of the Treasury Building features a statue of Hamilton by James Earle Fraser, which was dedicated on May 17, 1923.
- In Chicago, a thirteen-foot tall statue of Hamilton by sculptor John Angel was cast in 1939. It was not installed at Lincoln Park until 1952, due to problems with a controversial 78-foot tall columned shelter designed for it and later demolished in 1993. The statue has remained on public display, and was restored and regilded in 2016.
- A bronze sculpture of Hamilton titled The American Cape, by Kristen Visbal, was unveiled at Journal Square in downtown Hamilton, Ohio, in October 2004.

== Medals ==
- Columbia College in New York hands out the Alexander Hamilton Medal as its highest award to accomplished alumni and to those who have offered exceptional service to the school.

== Geographic sites ==
=== Cities ===
- Hamilton, Kansas
- Hamilton, Missouri
- Hamilton, Massachusetts
- Hamilton, Ohio
- Hamilton, New York

=== Counties and Townships ===
- Hamilton County, Florida
- Hamilton County, Illinois
- Hamilton County, Indiana
- Hamilton County, Kansas
- Hamilton County, Nebraska
- Hamilton County, New York
- Hamilton County, Ohio
- Hamilton County, Tennessee
- Hamilton Township, New Jersey
- Hamilton Township, Ohio

=== Streets ===
- Hamilton Avenue in Trenton, New Jersey
- Hamilton Terrace in New York, NY
- Alexander Hamilton Road at the Calverton National Cemetery in Wading River, New York
- Alexander Hamilton Blvd in Yorktown, Virginia

=== Landmarks ===
- Hamilton Square, New Jersey

== See also ==
- Bibliography of Alexander Hamilton
