= USS Jackson =

USS Jackson may refer to:

- USS Jackson (LCS-6), an Independence-class littoral combat ship commissioned in 2015

== See also ==
- USRC Jackson, a revenue cutter in commission from 1832 to 1864
- USS Andrew Jackson, a ballistic missile submarine in commission from 1963 to 1989
- USS Fort Jackson, a steamer in commission from 1863 to 1865
- USS Henry M. Jackson, a ballistic missile submarine in commission since 1984
- USS John P. Jackson, a steamer in commission from 1862 to 1865
- USS Nellie Jackson, a patrol vessel in commission from 1917 to 1918
- USCGC Jackson, a sunken cutter which was in commission from 1927 to 1944
- USS President Jackson, an attack transport in commission from 1942 to 1955
- USS Stonewall Jackson, a ballistic missile submarine in commission from 1964 to 1995
