= Morris-Taney-class cutter =

- A Morris-Taney-class revenue cutter

Class overview
- Builders: Webb & Allen, New York City
- Operators: United States Revenue-Marine
- Built: 1830–1833
- In service: 1830–1865
- Completed: 13
- Lost: 2

General characteristics
- Type: Revenue cutter
- Displacement: 112 tons
- Length: 78 ft (24 m)
- Beam: 21 ft 3 in (6.48 m)
- Draft: 7 ft 8 in (2.34 m)
- Sail plan: Topsail Schooner
- Complement: 20-24
- Armament: Typically 4 × 6 or 9-pounder guns

The Morris-Taney-class revenue cutters were 13 cutters built at New York City at the Webb and Allen shipyard between 1830 and 1833. These cutters were the backbone of the United States Revenue-Marine for more than a decade. Samuel Humphreys designed these cutters for roles as diverse as fighting pirates, privateers, combating smugglers and operating with naval forces. He designed the vessels on a naval schooner concept. They had Baltimore Clipper lines. The vessels, built by Webb and Allen, were designed by Isaac Webb and resembled Humphreys' design but had one less port.

According to William Thiessen, this was the first class of cutters where all ships were identical.

== Ships ==
Name	Commissioned	Decommissioned	Notes
Crawford	1830	1835	Sold.
Dexter	1830	1841	Sold.
Gallatin	1830	1849	Transferred to the United States Coast Survey.
Hamilton	1830	1853	Lost in a gale, 1853.
Morris	1831	1846	Sold.
Rush	1831	1840	Transferred to the Lighthouse Service. Sold, 1848.
Wolcott	1831	1846	Transferred to the Lighthouse Service, 1849. Sold, 1851.
Ingham	1832	1836	Sold to the Republic of Texas.
Jackson	1832	1865	Sold.
McLane	1832	1840	Sold.
Jefferson	1833	1847	Renamed Crawford, 1839. Wrecked, 1847.
Taney	1834	1858	Sold.
Washington	1833	1837	Sold.
