= USRC Rush (1831) =

- A Morris-Taney-class revenue cutter

History

United States
- Namesake: Richard Rush
- Builder: Webb and Allen, New York
- Commissioned: 1831
- Decommissioned: 30 March 1840
- Homeport: New York, New York
- Fate: transferred to the Lighthouse Establishment

General characteristics
- Class & type: Morris-Taney-class cutter
- Displacement: 112 tons
- Length: 73.4 ft (22.4 m)
- Beam: 20.6 ft (6.3 m)
- Draft: 9.7 ft (3.0 m)
- Complement: 20-24
- Armament: 6-9 pndrs

USRC Rush was one of 13 cutters of the Morris-Taney class to be launched. Named after Secretaries of the Treasury and Presidents of the United States, these cutters were the backbone of the Service for more than a decade. Samuel Humphreys designed these cutters for roles as diverse as fighting pirates, privateers, combating smugglers and operating with naval forces. He designed the vessels on a naval schooner concept. They had Baltimore Clipper lines. The vessels built by Webb and Allen, designed by Isaac Webb, resembled Humphreys' but had one less port.

Rush's official name was Richard Rush, named after Secretary of the Treasury at the time of her launching. The cutter operated out of New York. In January 1840, she was severely damaged by ice and on 30 March 1840 the Treasury Department authorized her transfer to the Lighthouse Establishment.

She has the distinction of being the "first" government-owned and operated lighthouse tender of the Lighthouse Establishment although her design as a revenue cutter left much to be desired when it came to servicing aids to navigation. She was identified in the official records as USLHT Richard Rush. She serviced aids to navigation in and around New York Harbor. The Lighthouse Establishment sold Richard Rush in 1848.
