= USRC Jackson =

Ship of the U.S. Revenue Cutter Service

- A Morris-Taney class Revenue Cutter

History

United States
- Namesake: Andrew Jackson
- Builder: Washington Navy Yard
- Laid down: 1831
- Commissioned: 1832
- Decommissioned: 31 October 1865
- Home port: Baltimore, Maryland; Mobile, Alabama; New Orleans, Louisiana; Newport, Rhode Island; Eastport, Maine
- Fate: Sold in 1865

General characteristics
- Class & type: Schooner
- Displacement: 112 tons
- Length: 73.4 ft (22.4 m)
- Beam: 20.6 ft (6.3 m)
- Draught: 9.7 ft (3.0 m)
- Propulsion: wind
- Complement: 20-24
- Armament: 6-9 pndrs

The United States Revenue Cutter Jackson was one of 13 cutters of the Morris-Taney Class to be launched. Named after Secretaries of the Treasury and Presidents of the United States, these cutters were the backbone of the Revenue Cutter Service for more than a decade. Samuel Humphreys designed these cutters for roles as diverse as fighting pirates, privateers, combating smugglers and operating with naval forces. He designed the vessels on a naval schooner concept. They had Baltimore Clipper lines. The vessels built by Webb and Allen, designed by Isaac Webb, resembled Humphreys' but had one less port.

The Jackson, named for Andrew Jackson, the seventh President of the United States, who was president at the time that the ship was commissioned.

== Construction ==
The cutter Jackson was built at the Washington Navy Yard in 1832 for the United States Revenue Cutter Service under the command of Capt. W. A. Howard, USRCS.

== Enforcing new tariff laws ==
Jackson sailed late in the year to Charleston, South Carolina, to be on hand there to support the Federal Government during the nullification crisis over new tariff laws. She and four other cutters forced ships arriving from foreign ports to anchor under the guns of Fort Moultrie and store their cargoes in the fort until the duties on them were paid at the newly established customs house at Castle Pinckney.

Tension subsided before the advent of spring, but the cutter—which carried the name of the President who had championed the Union cause during the Constitutional crisis—remained in Charleston harbor for regular duty. She apparently served there until relieved by Jefferson on 25 November 1834.

== Second Seminole War ==
Jackson then cruised along the coast to discourage smuggling operations and to assist distressed shipping. A year later, she operated briefly in the Chesapeake Bay before heading south to support Army and Navy operations along the coasts of Florida and Georgia during the Seminole War. Besides observing the activities of the Indians as she cruised along the shore, she inspected other revenue cutters and their stations as well as the lighthouses she passed.

== Pirate ship search ==
The ship returned north in the summer of 1837 but was directed on 19 September of that year to prepare for more service on the Florida coast under orders of the Secretary of the Navy. However, before beginning that mission, she got underway from Baltimore, Maryland, on an unsuccessful search for ". . . the pirate that had captured packet ship Susquehanna."

== Continued support operations ==
The cutter finally sailed for Pensacola, Florida, on 31 October and operated in the Gulf of Mexico. On 4 December, she moved via Tampa Bay to Charlotte Harbor to cooperate with the Army. Jackson remained in the gulf until returning to Baltimore on 7 April 1838, but headed back toward Southern waters again on 16 June. She returned to Baltimore that autumn, but set a course for Savannah, Georgia, on 28 November 1838. She was called back to Baltimore late in the spring of 1839.

== Service in the North ==
Following the end of the Seminole War, the cutter carried out a similar pattern of activity, alternating duty at Baltimore, Philadelphia, Pennsylvania, and New York City with service in Southern climes.

== Service in Baltimore ==
Soon after the beginning of the American Civil War, the ship entered the New York Navy Yard to receive armament. She departed New York on 26 April 1861 and sailed for Baltimore on 10 September. She served at that port throughout the conflict.

== Post-war decommissioning and sale ==
After the Civil War fighting ended, Jackson was sold in Baltimore in October 1865.
