= USRC Taney =

- A Morris-Taney class revenue cutter

History

United States
- Name: USRC Taney
- Namesake: Roger B. Taney
- Operator: United States Revenue Cutter Service
- Builder: Webb & Allen, New York City
- Launched: 26 December 1833
- Commissioned: January 1834
- Decommissioned: January 5, 1858
- Homeport: Norfolk, Virginia; Eastport, Maine
- Fate: Sold, January 1858

General characteristics
- Class & type: Morris-Taney-class cutter
- Displacement: 112 tons
- Length: 71 ft 1 in (21.67 m)
- Beam: 19 ft 6 in (5.94 m)
- Draft: 7 ft 2 in (2.18 m)
- Sail plan: Topsail schooner
- Complement: 20-24
- Armament: 6x12 pndrs

The United States Revenue Cutter Taney was one of the 13 cutters of the Morris-Taney class. These cutters were the backbone of the Revenue Cutter Service for more than a decade. Samuel Humphreys designed these cutters for roles as diverse as fighting pirates, privateers, combating smugglers and operating with naval forces. He designed the vessels on a naval schooner concept. They had Baltimore Clipper lines. The vessels built by Webb and Allen, designed by Isaac Webb, resembled Humphreys' but had one less port.

Officially the Roger B. Taney, this cutter initially made an inspection tour from Maine to Texas and then sailed to her first duty station at Norfolk, Virginia. Between 1847 and 1850 the cutter served with the Coast Survey. In May 1851 the Taney sailed for Savannah, Georgia. In 1852, after traveling to New York City, she capsized. In January 1853, after repairs, she sailed to for duty in Eastport, Maine. The Taney arrived back in Savannah in November 1855. Damage due to a strike by lightning off Tybee Island forced the Government to sell the cutter on 5 January 1858.
