= HMS Medea (1833) =

Sloop of the Royal Navy

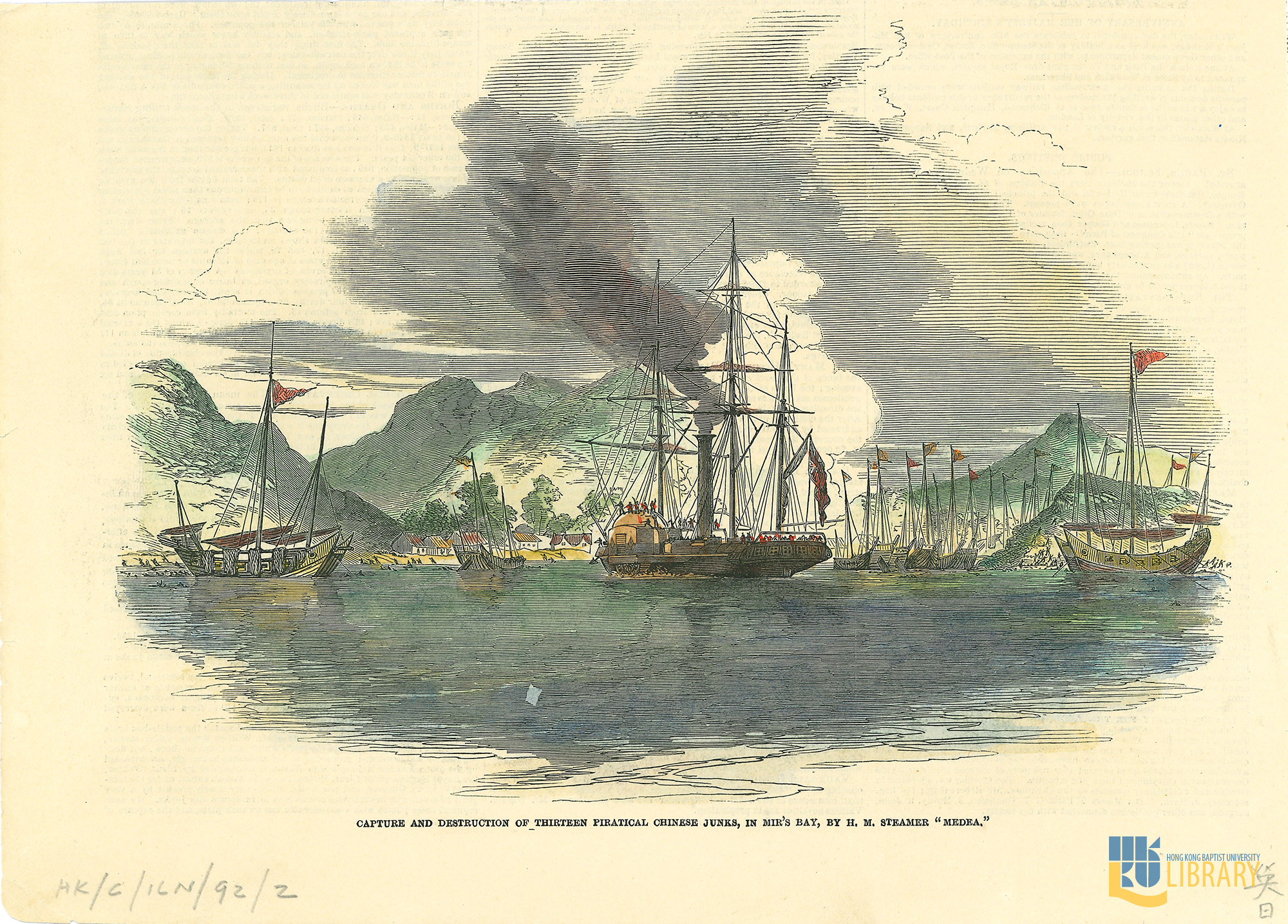
- Capture and destruction of thirteen piratical Chinese Junks, in Mirs Bay, by H.M. Steamer 'Medea'

History

United Kingdom
- Name: HMS Medea
- Ordered: 12 January 1831
- Builder: Woolwich Dockyard
- Cost: £35,961
- Laid down: April 1831
- Launched: 2 September 1833
- Completed: 3 April 1834
- Commissioned: 30 January 1834
- Honours and awards: Syrian Coast 1840
- Fate: Broken up at Portsmouth in January 1867

General characteristics
- Type: Paddle sloop
- Displacement: 1,142 tons
- Tons burthen: 835 bm
- Length: 179 ft 4.5 in (54.7 m) gundeck; 157 ft 4.875 in (48.0 m) keel for tonnage
- Beam: 31 ft 11 in (9.7 m) maximum; 31 ft 7 in (9.6 m) for tonnage
- Draught: 13 ft 10 in (4.2 m) (forward); 14 ft 6 in (4.4 m) (aft)
- Depth of hold: 20 ft (6.1 m)
- Propulsion: 350 nominal horsepower; 2-cylinder VSE side lever steam engine; re-engined 1846; 4-cylinder Siamese steam engine; 900 ihp (670 kW); Paddles
- Sail plan: Schooner rig, later changed to barquentine
- Speed: 10.6 knots (19.6 km/h) (under steam)
- Complement: 135
- Armament: 2 × 10-inch (84 cwt) pivot guns; 2 (later 4) × 32-pounder (25 cwt) guns; 1862 1 x 110 pounder

HMS Medea was one of the initial steam-powered vessels built for the Royal Navy. On 10 January 1831 the new First Lord Sir James Graham, 2nd Baronet gave orders that four paddle vessels be built to competitive designs. The vessels were to be powered by Maudslay, Son & Field steam engines, carry a schooner rig and mount one or two 10-inch shell guns. Initially classed simply as a steam vessel (SV), she was re-classed as a second-class steam sloop when that categorization was introduced on 31 May 1844. Designed by Oliver Lang, the master shipwright of Woolwich. She was launched and completed in 1834, took part in the Syrian Coast Campaign and was broken up in 1867.

Medea was the fifth named vessel (spelt Medea or Medee) since it was introduced for a 26-gun, sixth rate (Medee) captured from the French on 4 April 1744 by HMS Dreadnought, sold in March 1745 to become the privateer Boscawen.

== Design and specifications ==
Her keel was laid in April 1832 at Woolwich Dockyard and launched on 2 September 1833. Her gundeck was 179 feet 4.5 inches (54.67 metres) with her keel length reported for tonnage calculation was 157 feet 4.875 inches (47.98 metres). Her maximum breadth was 31 feet 11 inches (9.73 metres) with 31 feet 7 inches (9.63 metres) being reported for tonnage. Her depth of hold was 20 feet 0 inches (6.10 metres). Her light draught was 13 feet 10 inches (4.22 metres) forward and 14 feet 6 inches (4.42 metres) aft. Her builder's measure tonnage was 835 tons though her displacement was 1,142 tons.

Her machinery was supplied by John Penn & Sons of Greenwich. She was fitted with two fire-tube rectangular boilers. Her steam engine was a two-cylinder vertical single expansion (VSE) engine rated at 350 nominal horsepower (NHP). In 1846 she was re-engined with a Maudslay 4-cylinder Siamese engine of 220 NHP. During her steam trials the engine generated 900 indicated horsepower (670 kW) for a speed of 10.6 knots (19.6 km/h). She originally was to have a schooner sail plan, however, this was changed to a barque or barquentine sail rig.

Her armament initially consisted of two Miller's Original 10-inch 84 hundredweight (cwt) (Note: "cwt", or "hundredweight" refers to the weight of the gun itself.) muzzle loading smooth bore (MLSB) shell guns on pivot mounts and two Bloomfield's 32-pounder (Note: "32-pounder" refers to the weight of the shot fired.) 25 cwt MLSB guns on broadside trucks. The number of 32-pounders was later increased to four guns. In 1862 one of the 10-inch guns was replaced by an Armstrong 7-inch rifled breach loading (RBL) gun on a pivot mount. This Armstrong gun was more commonly known as the 100/110-pounder depending on the weight of shell carried. This gun was probably withdrawn in the late 1860s due to a weakness in the breach mechanism.

She was completed on 12 February 1833 with an initial cost of £35,961 (including machinery - £13,080). (Note: A total cost accounting for inflation of approximately £3,225,500 in today's money.)

== Commissioned service ==
=== First commission ===
Her first commission was on 30 January 1834 under the command of Commander Horatio Thomas Austin, RN for service in the Mediterranean. She returned to Home Waters paying off in October 1837.

=== Second commission ===
Her next commissioning would occur on 14 February 1838 under the command of Commander John Neale Nott, RN for service on the North America and West Indies Station, including the St Lawrence River. She returned to Home Waters paying off in November 1839.

=== Third commission ===
She commissioned on 12 August 1840 under Commander Frederick Warden, RN for service in the Mediterranean. She was involved with operations of the Syrian coast in late 1840 and the blockade of Alexandria. When ordered to return to Home Waters she proceeded to Greece to pick up the Xanthian Marbles. These were a group of marble artifacts discovered in Greece by Sir Charles Fellows at the city of Xanthus in 1838 and are now on display in the British Museum. She paid off on 15 May 1845.

=== Fourth commission ===
During her time in reserve her engine was changed. She was commissioned on 2 November 1846 under the command of Commander Francis Thomas Brown, RN. On 5 November 1846 Commander Graham E.W. Hammond assumed command. Commander Thomas Henry Mason, RN took command after the death of Commander Hamond on 23 January 1847 for service on the East Indies and China Station. Commander William Nicholar Lockyer, RN took temporary command on 20 February 1849 with his assumption of command confirmed on 7 December 1849. On 8 September she was in action with five pirate junks. Ordered to Home Waters she arrived on 1 July 1850 carrying the Koh-i-Noor diamond. She paid off on 8 July at Portsmouth. Here she underwent a refit starting in 1851 and completing in 1852.

=== Fifth commission ===
Her fifth commission started on 18 December 1852 under the command of Commander John Crawshay Bailey, RN for service on the North America and West Indies Station. She returned to Home Waters in November 1853. On 16 November 1853 Commander Augustus Phillimore, RN took command for service in Home Waters. She went aground off Spurn Point on 30 December 1853. After being refloated she went to Woolwich for repairs in January 1854. After being repaired she went to the North America and West Indies Station in May 1854. On 10 October 1855 Commander Edward Peirse, RN took command. She returned to Home Waters paying off into the Portsmouth Steam Reserve on 17 June 1856. She underwent a repair and refit at Portsmouth in 1860.

=== Sixth commission ===
Her last commission commenced on 18 September 1861 under the command of Commander D'Arcy Spense Preston, RN for service on the North America and West Indies Station. She returned to Home Waters paying off for the last time at Portsmouth on 22 June 1865.

== Disposition ==
She was surveyed then condemned in December 1866. She was broken up in January 1867.
