= USRC McLane =

- A Morris-Taney class Revenue Cutter

History

United States
- Namesake: Louis McLane
- Builder: Webb and Allen, New York
- Laid down: 1833
- Launched: 1833
- Commissioned: 1833
- Decommissioned: 21 October 1840
- Homeport: Charleston, South Carolina; New Bedford, Massachusetts
- Fate: Sold

General characteristics
- Class & type: Schooner
- Displacement: 112 tons
- Length: 73.4 ft (22.4 m)
- Beam: 20.6 ft (6.3 m)
- Draught: 9.7 ft (3.0 m)
- Propulsion: wind
- Complement: 20-24
- Armament: 6-9 pndrs

The United States Revenue Cutter McLane was one of 13 cutters of the Morris-Taney Class to be launched. Named after Secretaries of the Treasury and Presidents of the United States, these cutters were the backbone of the Service for more than a decade. Samuel Humphreys designed these cutters for roles as diverse as fighting pirates, privateers, combating smugglers and operating with naval forces. He designed the vessels on a naval schooner concept. They had Baltimore Clipper lines. The vessels built by Webb and Allen, designed by Isaac Webb, resembled Humphreys' but had one less port.

Named for the Louis McLane, the tenth Secretary of the Treasury of the United States, USRC McLane was noted for her beautiful deck finish and cabinet work. An early historian of the Service, Revenue Captain Horatio D. Smith, USRCS, wrote of her:

The Revenue Cutter McLane when finished in 1832 was ordered to Washington, and while at the Navy Yard was visited by many people, especially members of Congress, and was admired by all for her beauty, symmetry and elegance of finish. Her armament was four brass 9-pounders on elegant carriages, with small arms to correspond. Other vessels were built of larger dimensions, but the McLane excelled them all in beauty and sailing qualities. She was the crack vessel of her time. Subsequently many of [those cutters in her class] were sold ... to Cubans, who used them for slavers.

McLane served in Charleston, South Carolina in 1832 and in 1833 sailed to New Bedford, Massachusetts for revenue duty there. She capsized in Hadley Harbor in Massachusetts during a tornado in 1837, was raised and put back in duty until 1840, when she was sold.
