= USRC Crawford (1830) =

Historic Revenue Cutter Service ship

- A Morris-Taney class Revenue Cutter

History

United States
- Namesake: William H. Crawford
- Builder: Webb and Allen, New York
- Completed: 1830
- Commissioned: January 1830
- Decommissioned: 27 July 1835
- Homeport: Norfolk, Virginia, Savannah, Georgia
- Fate: Sold 1 April 1839, wrecked 15 December 1847

General characteristics
- Class & type: Schooner
- Displacement: 112 tons
- Length: 73.4 ft (22.4 m)
- Beam: 20.6 ft (6.3 m)
- Draught: 9.7 ft (3.0 m) (aft)
- Propulsion: sail
- Sail plan: topsail schooner
- Crew: 20-24 officers and men
- Armament: (4) 6-9 pndrs (typical of class)

The United States Revenue Cutter Crawford was the first of the 13 cutters of the Morris-Taney Class to be launched. These cutters were the backbone of the U.S. Revenue Cutter Service for more than a decade. Samuel Humphreys designed these cutters for roles as diverse as fighting pirates, privateers, combating smugglers and operating with naval forces. He designed the vessels on a naval schooner concept. They had Baltimore Clipper lines. The vessels built by Webb and Allen, designed by Isaac Webb, resembled Humphreys' but had one less port

The Crawford, named for Secretary of the Treasury William H. Crawford, initially was assigned to the Collector of Customs in Norfolk, Virginia. In June 1831, she sailed for duty at Savannah, Georgia, arriving on July 1, 1835. The Government sold her in 1835 for $2,300.

The USRC Swiftsure (1825) was renamed Crawford on 31 December 1835 and sold 1 April 1839. USRC Jefferson (commissioned in 1832), was renamed Crawford in 1839 and served until 15 December 1847 when she was wrecked near New London, Connecticut
