= USRC Gallatin (1830) =

- A Morris-Taney class Revenue Cutter

History

United States
- Namesake: Albert Gallatin
- Builder: Webb and Allen, New York
- Launched: 1830
- Commissioned: 1830
- Decommissioned: August 1849
- Reinstated: October 1848
- Homeport: Wilmington, North Carolina, Charleston, South Carolina; Wilmington, Delaware
- Fate: transferred to the Coast Survey

General characteristics
- Class & type: Schooner
- Displacement: 112 tons
- Length: 73.4 ft (22.4 m)
- Beam: 20.6 ft (6.3 m)
- Draught: 9.7 ft (3.0 m)
- Propulsion: wind
- Complement: 20-24
- Armament: 6-9 pndrs

The USRC Gallatin was a revenue cutter of the United States Revenue-Marine, one of 13 cutters of the Morris-Taney class to be launched. Named after Secretaries of the Treasury and Presidents of the United States, these cutters were the backbone of the U.S. Revenue-Marine for more than a decade. Samuel Humphreys designed these cutters for roles as diverse as fighting pirates, privateers, combating smugglers, and operating with United States Navy forces. He designed the vessels on a naval schooner concept. They had Baltimore Clipper lines. The vessels built by Webb and Allen, designed by Isaac Webb, resembled those of Humphreys, but had one less port.

After going into commission, Gallatin traveled to Wilmington, North Carolina. On 16 November 1832, Gallatin was transferred to Charleston, South Carolina, to help suppress the efforts by South Carolina to nullify the Tariff of 1828. On 5 April 1833, she sailed for Wilmington, Delaware, where she remained until transferred to the United States Coast Survey in April 1840. She returned to Revenue-Marine service in October 1848 and was transferred back to the Coast Survey in August 1849.
