= USRC Hamilton (1830) =

- A Morris-Taney class Revenue Cutter

History

United States
- Namesake: Alexander Hamilton
- Builder: New York Navy Yard
- Commissioned: 1830
- Decommissioned: 9 December 1853
- Homeport: Boston, Massachusetts, 1830–1851; Charleston, South Carolina, 1851–1853
- Fate: lost in a gale 1853

General characteristics
- Class & type: Morris-Taney-class cutter
- Displacement: 112 tons
- Length: 78 ft (24 m)
- Beam: 20.6 ft (6.3 m)
- Draft: 9.7 ft (3.0 m) (aft)
- Propulsion: sail
- Sail plan: topsail schooner
- Crew: 20-24 officers and men
- Armament: (4) 6-9 pndrs (typical of class)

The United States Revenue Cutter Hamilton was one of 13 cutters of the Morris-Taney Class to be launched. Named after Secretaries of the Treasury and Presidents of the United States, these cutters were the backbone of the Service for more than a decade. Samuel Humphreys designed these cutters for roles as diverse as fighting pirates, privateers, combating smugglers and operating with naval forces. He designed the vessels on a naval schooner concept. They had Baltimore Clipper lines. The vessels built by Webb and Allen, designed by Isaac Webb, resembled Humphreys' but had one less port.

The Hamilton, the fastest vessel in the class, was named for Founding Father Alexander Hamilton and operated out of Boston for much of her career. She became famous for rescues and saving of property. Josiah Sturgis was her captain for much of this time. She became well known and extremely popular, so much so that music was written entitled the "Hamilton Quick step." The Hamilton transferred to Charleston, South Carolina in 1851. She was wrecked on the Tully Breakers on 9 December 1853 with the loss of fourteen of her fifteen crew.

== Notes ==
Citations

References cited

- "(Alexander) Hamilton, (1830)" (pdf). Cutters, Craft & U.S. Coast Guard-Manned Army & Navy Vessels. U.S. Coast Guard Historian's Office.
- Canney, Donald L. (1995). U.S. Coast Guard and Revenue Cutters, 1790–1935. Naval Institute Press, Annapolis, Maryland. ISBN 978-1-55750-101-1.
