= USRC Jefferson (1833) =

- A Morris-Taney class Revenue Cutter

History

United States
- Namesake: Thomas Jefferson
- Builder: Webb and Allen, New York
- Laid down: 1832
- Launched: 1833
- Commissioned: 1833
- Decommissioned: 15 December 1847
- Renamed: April 1839 as the USRC Crawford
- Home port: Norfolk, Virginia; Mobile, Alabama; Savannah, Georgia; New London, Connecticut (as the Crawford
- Fate: wrecked off Gardiners Point, New York 1847

General characteristics
- Class & type: Schooner
- Displacement: 112 tons
- Length: 73.4 ft (22.4 m)
- Beam: 20.6 ft (6.3 m)
- Draft: 9.7 ft (3.0 m)
- Propulsion: wind
- Complement: 20-24
- Armament: 6-9 pndrs

The United States Revenue Cutter Jefferson was one of 13 cutters of the Morris-Taney Class to be launched. Named after Secretaries of the Treasury and Presidents of the United States, these cutters were the backbone of the Service for more than a decade. Samuel Humphreys designed these cutters for roles as diverse as fighting pirates, privateers, combating smugglers and operating with naval forces. He designed the vessels on a naval schooner concept. They had Baltimore Clipper lines. The vessels built by Webb and Allen, designed by Isaac Webb, resembled Humphreys' but had one less port.

Named for the Founding Father and third president of the United States, Thomas Jefferson, she was the second Morris-Taney class cutter to be named after a president.

In January 1833, the Jefferson suffered damage in a collision during her initial cruise. She began her career in Norfolk, Virginia and the following year sailed to Charleston, South Carolina. She was placed under orders of the United States Secretary of the Navy on 6 January 1836 for service against the Seminole Indians in Florida, Captain John Jackson, USRM, in command. She sailed from Charleston on February 19, and arrived in Pensacola on April 30. From that time until 18 October 1837 she was active in the Gulf of Mexico visiting ports on the coast of Florida, Alabama, Mississippi, the Republic of Texas, and Mexico. From time to time her duties took her to the West Indies. Returning to the Treasury Department 18 October 1837, Jefferson resumed her duties as a revenue cutter at Mobile, Alabama.

After the war duty the revenue service found the cutter to be in complete disrepair, needing more than $5,000 of work. They sent Jefferson to Baltimore with the intention of selling her. The Government replaced her with a new Jefferson. Despite the expense, the cutter was repaired, and put back in service. Stationed in Savannah, Georgia she was renamed Crawford in April 1839. This name was now available as the old Swiftsure, renamed the Crawford, was sold in 1839.

The Crawford, now stationed in New London, Connecticut, wrecked off Gardiners Point on 15 December 1847.
