= Virginia (schooner) =

Replica of a wooden pilot vessel

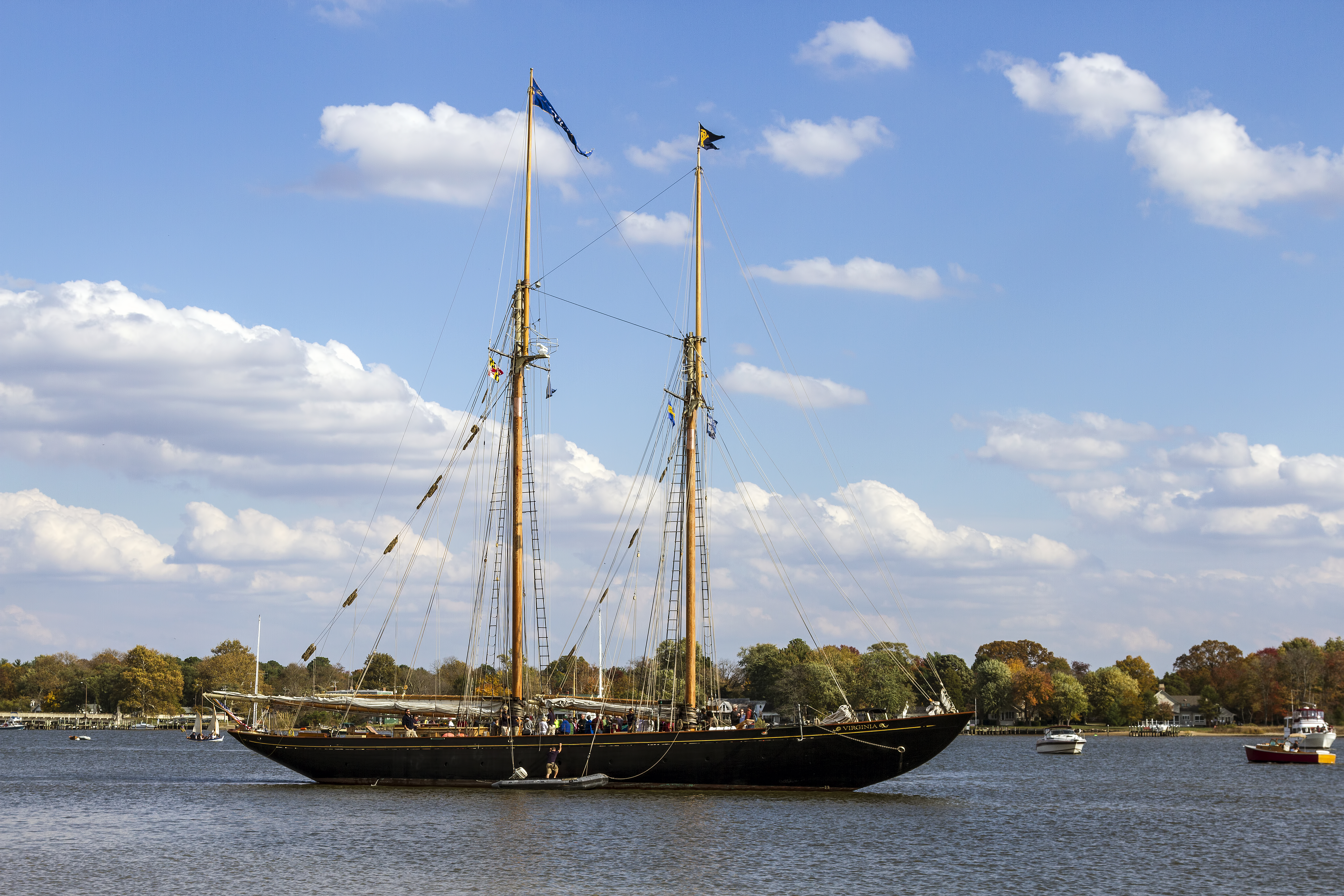
- Virginia on the Chester River in 2013

History

United States
- Name: Virginia
- Namesake: Pilot schooner Virginia
- Owner: City of Norfolk and the Nauticus Foundation
- Builder: Tri-Coastal Marine
- Completed: 2005
- Home port: Norfolk, Virginia
- Identification: MMSI number: 369002000; Callsign: WDC4156

General characteristics
- Displacement: 160 long tons
- Length: 122 ft (37 m) overall; 84 ft (26 m) at waterline
- Beam: 23.8 ft (7.3 m)
- Draft: 12.25 ft (3.73 m)
- Depth: 19.5 ft (5.9 m)
- Propulsion: Sails; two Caterpillar 6 Cylinder 205hp Diesels
- Sail plan: Two-masted schooner, seven sails: gaff mainsail, gaff foresail, two gaff topsails, fisherman's staysail, staysail, two jibs
- Crew: 10
- Notes: 6,438 square feet (598.1 m^{2}) sail area

Virginia is a wooden schooner that is a modern replica of an early twentieth century pilot vessel of the same name. She conducts educational programs and passenger trips along the Eastern Seaboard of the United States and Canada and in the Caribbean.

== The original Virginia ==
The original schooner Virginia was commissioned by the Virginia Pilots Association and designed by naval engineers Cox and Stevens. Pilots Association president William Rowe Boutwell instructed the designers to model the vessel after the America's Cup competitors of the day. She was built by A.C. Brown & Son of Tottenville, Staten Island, New York, and was completed in 1916. Although steamboats were readily available at the time, Virginia was built with no engines so as to maintain the pilots' sailing skills and train new apprentices.

Virginia served actively as a pilot vessel during World War I. Following the war, she was fitted with two 75 hp diesel engines, which necessitated a shortening of her fore boom to accommodate a smokestack.

In 1939, Virginia was sold to Walter K. Queen of Boston. She was sold again in 1944, and in 1945 was sold to her final owner, William H. Hoeffer of New York. In 1947 she was reported "stranded".

== The modern Virginia ==
The replica Virginia was commissioned by the Virginia Maritime Heritage Foundation and built, with about $5 million in state and federal funding, by Tri-Coastal Marine in Norfolk, Virginia. She was completed in 2005. She is a gaff rigged knockabout schooner, meaning she lacks a bowsprit; her headsails can be handled and furled from the deck.

In 2004, the Virginia Senate deferred a bill that would establish the Commonwealth of Virginia as a co-owner of the Virginia.

In 2007, Virginia was awarded a $10,000 grant from the United States Department of Justice's Office of Juvenile Justice and Delinquency Prevention Program, by way of the American Sail Training Association, for her youth sail training programs.

In 2014 it was reported that Virginia was for sale, with an asking price of $1.8 million. The Virginia Maritime Heritage Foundation's sail-training programme was proving unsustainable, with it costing about $1 million a year to run the schooner. In 2016 a listing on YachtWorld.com showed Virginia's asking price as $1.5m.

=== Programs ===
In the summer, Virginia offers week-long educational programs for boys and girls aged 13–17. In conjunction with the professional crew, the trainees help to sail, maintain, and navigate the ship. Virginia also provides scholarships to allow underserved youth to participate in these programs.

Virginia also carries paying guests between various destination points.

Virginia has raced in the Great Chesapeake Bay Schooner Race several times.

== See also ==
- List of schooners
