= Maple Leaf (schooner) =

Canadian schooner built in 1904

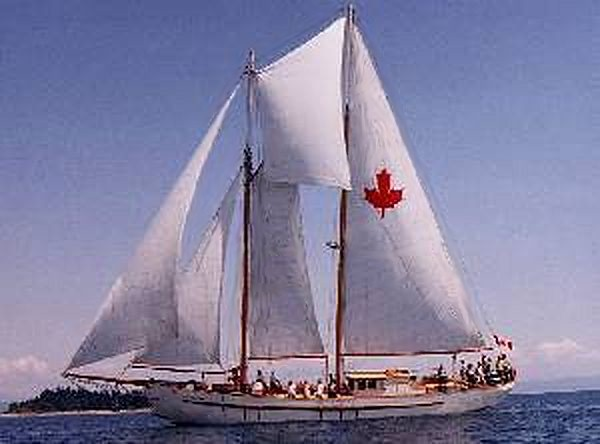
- The Schooner Maple Leaf

History
- Name: Maple Leaf
- Namesake: "Maple Leaf"
- Builder: Vancouver, British Columbia
- Launched: 1904
- Status: in active service

General characteristics
- Type: Schooner
- Displacement: ~80 long tons (81 t)
- Length: 92 ft (28 m) o/a; 75 ft (23 m) on deck; 70 ft (21 m) w/l
- Propulsion: Sail

The Maple Leaf is a schooner built in 1904, making it the oldest tall ship still sailing in British Columbia. In 1906, the Maple Leaf was the only Canadian vessel to qualify for the first ever Transpacific Yacht Race, which was ultimately cancelled due to the San Francisco earthquake that year.

Today, the Maple Leaf operates as a sail training vessel ecotourism schooner, offering small-ship expeditions along the west coast of North America. The vessel accommodates up to eight passengers and is recognized for its sustainable tourism practices.

== History ==
The schooner was commissioned in 1904 by Vancouver businessman Alexander MacLaren, who sought to build the fastest and finest sailing yacht on the West Coast. He enlisted Captain William Watts, founder of Vancouver Shipyard (now Vancouver Shipyards), to build the vessel.

Beginning in the 1930s, the Maple Leaf was repurposed as a halibut longliner and fished in the Bering Sea for several decades, becoming one of the longest-serving commercial fishing vessels of its kind.

In 1980, the ship was purchased at a government auction by conservationist Brian Falconer, who restored it and converted it into an eco cruise ship. In 2001, Falconer sold the ship in 2001 to Kevin Smith who continued the ecotourism business to present day.

== Construction ==
Originally built as a yacht, Maple Leaf has many features that make it a very unusual ship. The ribs are made of coastal yellow cedar wood. The planking, decks, and beams were constructed of coastal Douglas fir wood—materials emblematic of the Pacific Northwest.

The ship's brightwork, made of mahogany, was gifted by relatives of the builder. Notably, the Maple Leaf was the first vessel north of San Francisco to be equipped with electric lighting, and among the first on the coast to feature an external lead keel. The rigging of the Maple Leaf consists of a gaff-rigged fore sail, a Marconi main sail, a jib, a staysail, and a square fisherman's staysail.

== See also ==
- List of schooners
- List of historic vessels in British Columbia
