= Lettie G. Howard =

Schooner (built 1893)

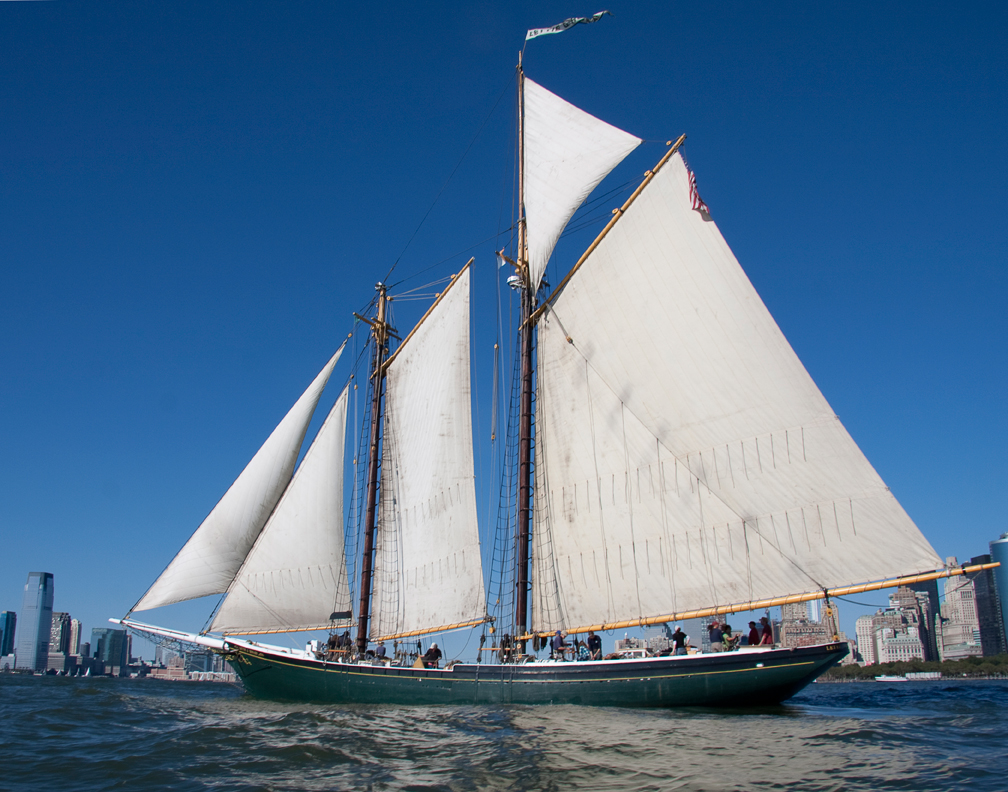
- Lettie G. Howard sailing in New York Harbor

History

United States
- Name: Lettie G. Howard
- Namesake: Lettie G. Howard Barron
- Owner: South Street Seaport Museum
- Operator: South Street Seaport Museum Erie
- Route: Northeast United States, Great Lakes
- Builder: A.D. Story Yard, Essex, Massachusetts
- Launched: 1893
- Acquired: 1968
- Refit: 1993
- Home port: New York City, New York
- Identification: MMSI number: 367405670; Callsign: WDE8452
- Status: Sea-going museum ship

General characteristics
- Type: two-masted gaff schooner
- Displacement: 102 short tons (93 t)
- Length: 125.4 ft (38.2 m) overall
- Beam: 21.1 ft (6.4 m)
- Draft: 10.6 ft (3.2 m)
- Depth of hold: 8.4 ft (2.6 m)
- Sail plan: mainsail, main topsail, foresail, staysail, jib; 5,072 square feet (471.2 m^{2})
- Crew: 17 POB for exposed waters, 36 POB for day sails, 20 POB overnight (Captain, Lic Mate crew varies: bosun, engineer, cook deckhand up to 7 paid crew)
- Lettie G. Howard (schooner)
- U.S. National Register of Historic Places
- U.S. National Historic Landmark
- New York State Register of Historic Places
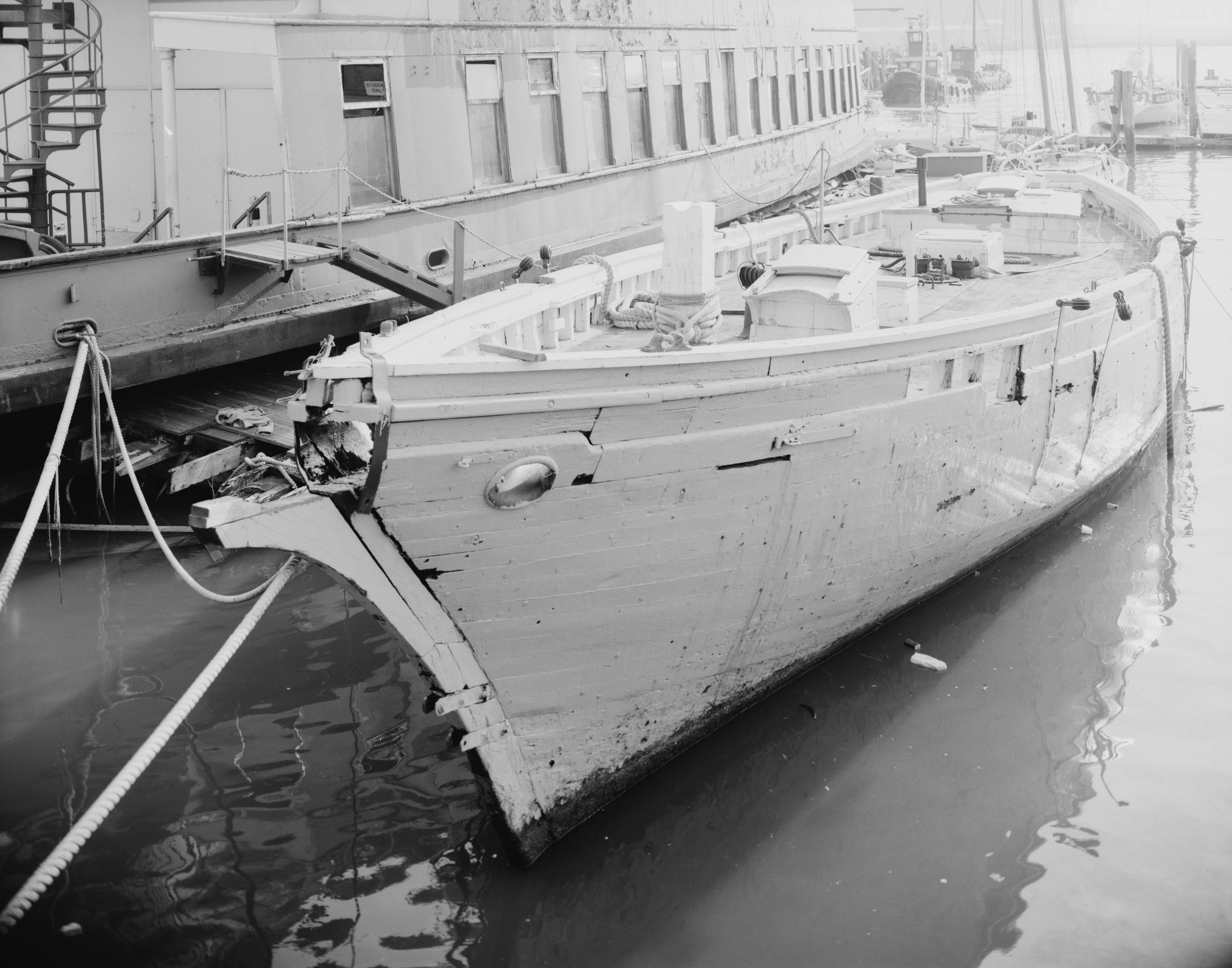
- Lettie G. Howard in 1989 prior to restoration
- Location: South Street Seaport, New York City, New York
- Area: less than one acre
- Built: 1893
- Architect: Arthur D. Story
- Architectural style: Fredonia schooner
- NRHP reference No.: 84002779
- NYSRHP No.: 06101.000657

Significant dates
- Added to NRHP: 7 September 1984
- Designated NHL: 11 April 1989
- Designated NYSRHP: 23 June 1980

Lettie G. Howard, formerly Mystic C and Caviare, is a wooden Fredonia schooner built in 1893 in Essex, Massachusetts. This type of craft was commonly used by American offshore fishermen, and is the older of two surviving examples of its type. She was declared a National Historic Landmark in 1989. She is now based at the South Street Seaport Museum in New York City.

== Description and history ==
Lettie G. Howard is a two-masted wooden-hulled fishing schooner. She is 74.6 feet (22.7 m) long, with a beam of 21 feet (6.4 m) and a hold depth of 8.4 feet (2.6 m). She has a gross tonnage of 59.74 and a net tonnage of 56.76. Her hull has a frame of oak timbers, covered in treenailed pine planking. The belowdecks area was historically divided into a forecastle third where the crew quarters were located, the main fish hold in the center, and a smaller storage area aft.

The schooner was built in 1893 at a shipyard in Essex, Massachusetts, by noted shipbuilder Arthur D. Story, one of four co-owners. She operated on the Georges Banks until 1901, when she ran aground on a shoal near Gurnet Point, Massachusetts. In 1902, she was sold to E.E. Saunders of Pensacola, Florida, who used her to fish for red snapper off the coast of the Yucatan Peninsula. She was taken out of service in 1922, and rebuilt in 1923, given the name Mystic C. In 1966, she was sold to Historic Ship Associates of Gloucester, Massachusetts, which converted her into a museum ship, mistakenly named Caviare after an 1891 ship of that name. That museum failed, and in 1968 she was sold to the South Street Seaport Museum and refinished. She was restored in 1991 and is currently certified by the U.S. Coast Guard as a Sailing School Vessel training and working museum ship. She currently sails along the Northeast seaboard. She underwent extensive shipyard repairs in Portland, Maine, in the second half of 2013.

In 2014, the schooner received two awards relating to her programming and historic restoration efforts; the Tall Ships America 2014 Sail Training Vessel of the Year Award, and the New York Landmarks Conservancy Lucy G. Moses Preservation Award.

In 2015, the vessel and crew took third place in the Gloucester Schooner Festival's Esperanto Cup. Part of the crew was made up of High school students, from the New York Harbor School, and the MAST Academy.

In 2018, the schooner sailed to Lake Erie and is currently hosted by the Flagship Niagara League, offering sailing tours from Dobbins Landing in Erie, Pennsylvania.

== See also ==
- Effie M. Morrissey, only other remaining Fredonia schooner
- List of schooners
- List of National Historic Landmarks in New York City
- National Register of Historic Places listings in Manhattan below 14th Street
