= ARM Cuauhtémoc =

Sail training vessel of the Mexican Navy

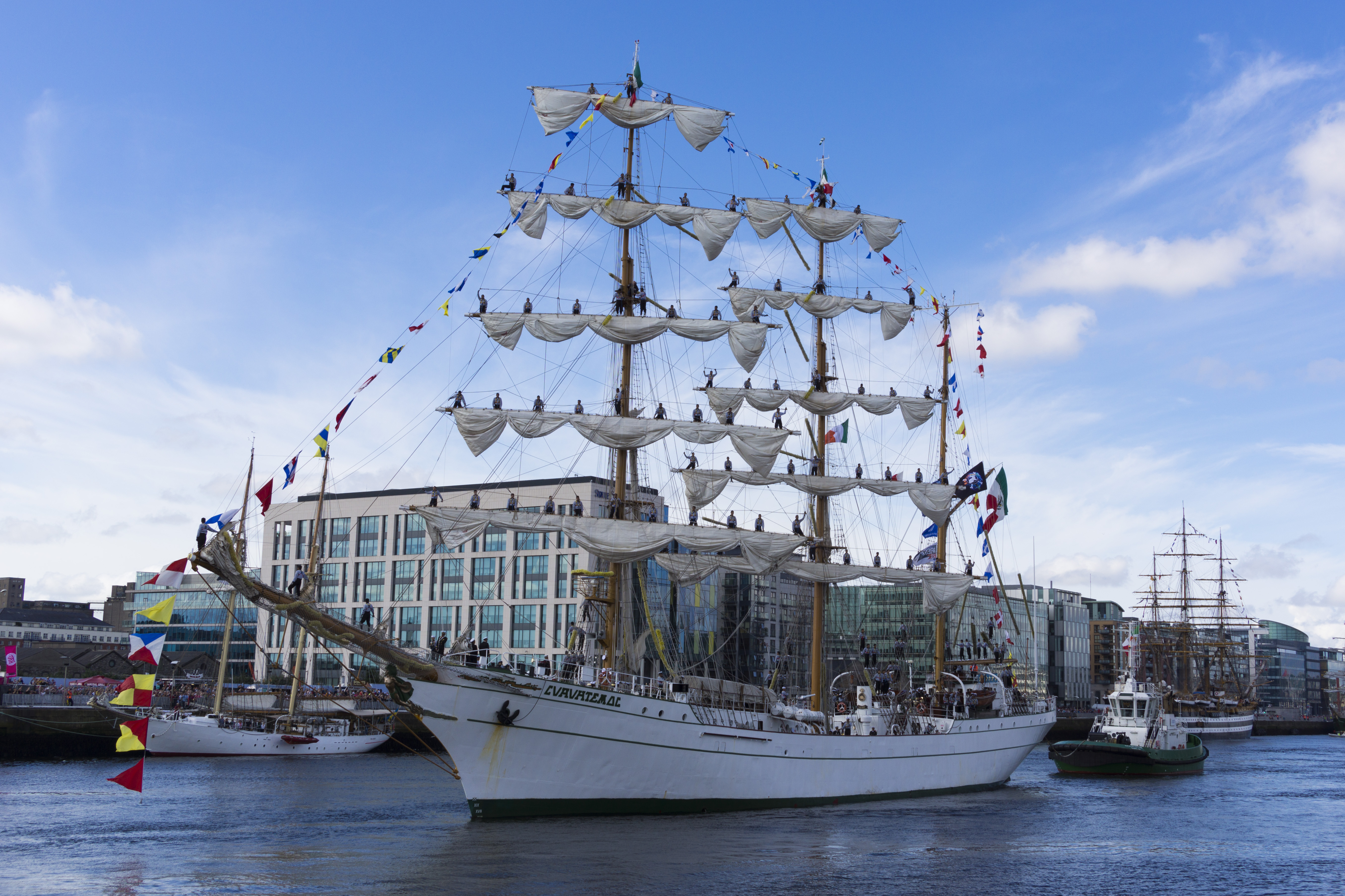
- ARM Cuauhtémoc on 26 August 2012

History

Mexico
- Name: Cuauhtémoc
- Namesake: Cuauhtémoc
- Builder: Astilleros Celaya S.A., Bilbao, Spain
- Launched: 1 September 1982
- Commissioned: 29 July 1982
- Home port: Acapulco, Mexico
- Identification: IMO number: 8107505; MMSI number: 345186001; Pennant number: BE01
- Status: Active
- Notes: Ship fully repaired by September 2025 after Brooklyn Bridge collision.
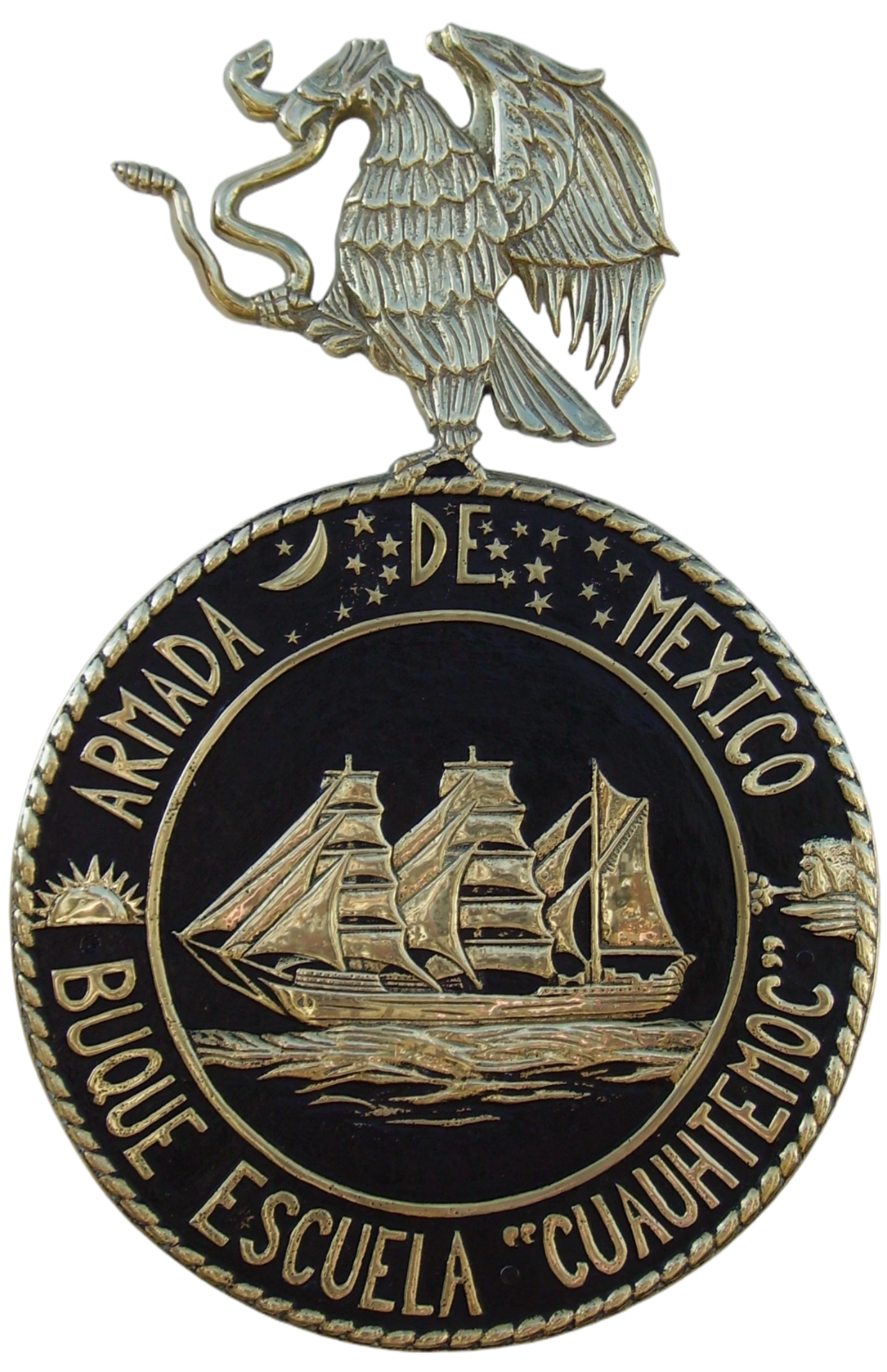
- Badge

General characteristics
- Type: Training ship
- Displacement: 1,800 tons
- Length: 220 ft 4 in (67.16 m) waterline
- Beam: 39 ft 4 in (11.99 m)
- Draft: 17 ft 7 in (5.36 m)
- Installed power: 1,125 hp (839 kW) auxiliary engine
- Propulsion: 1 × D-399 diesel engine; Sail
- Sail plan: Barque; Sparred length: 296.9 ft (90.5 m); Sail area: 25,489 ft^{2} (2,368.0 m^{2})
- Capacity: Fuel capacity: 220 tons; Water capacity: 110 tons
- Complement: Officers and crew: 186; Midshipmen/Cadets: 90

ARM Cuauhtémoc is a Mexican Navy three-masted barque. Launched in 1982, she is used as a sail training vessel.

== History ==
Cuauhtémoc is the last of four sister ships built by the naval shipyards of Bilbao, Spain, in 1982, all built to a design similar to the 1930 designs of the German firm Blohm & Voss, like Gorch Fock, USCGC Eagle, and NRP Sagres. Built at the Celaya Shipyards in Bilbao, she was designed by naval engineer Juan José Alonso Verástegui. Her keel was laid on 24 July 1981, and she was delivered to the Mexican Navy at Bilbao on 19 July 1982. A crew of cadets from the Mexican Naval Academy received the ship and brought Cuauhtémoc to Mexico.

Like her sister ships, Colombia's ARC Gloria, Ecuador's BAE Guayas and Venezuela's Simón Bolívar, Cuauhtémoc is a sailing ambassador for her home country and a frequent visitor to world ports, having sailed over 400,000 nautical miles (700,000 km) in her 43 years of service, with appearances at the Cutty Sark Tall Ships' Races, the American Sail Training Association Tall Ships Challenges, Sail Osaka, and others.

Following her collision with the Brooklyn Bridge in May 2025, Cuauhtémoc has since returned to service, visiting Victoria, Canada, in September 2026. On September 23, she arrived in San Francisco.

== Incidents ==
=== Collision with Portugalete suspension bridge ===
In 2007, while transiting the El Abra route down the Bilbao estuary in Spain, the mainmast collided with the suspension bridge in the municipality of Portugalete. There was only minor damage to the top of the mainmast. There were no injuries and the ship was not stopped. The maneuver was a calculated risk by the local authorities since all boats had to clear the 45-metre (148 ft) bridge. The height of Cuauhtémoc was 45.5 metres (149 ft 3 in) and normally the maneuvers are done at high tide, so the local pilots coordinated everything to avoid mishaps. A similar collision also happened to the Portuguese training ship NRP Sagres in 2000.

=== Disappearance of a cadet ===
On 11 June 2017, a cadet fell overboard from the ship during a sail maneuver near Mumbai, India. Despite intensive searches coordinated between Mexico and India, she was not located. In the vessel's 35 years of service up to that point, this was the first fatal incident.

=== Brooklyn Bridge collision ===
On the evening of 17 May 2025, during the training cruise that began on 6 April 2025, Cuauhtémoc's three masts collided with the Brooklyn Bridge. At least 19 of the people aboard were injured, four critically. A search and rescue operation was launched. Two of the injured subsequently died.

== Crest ==
The body of the shield is made up of two concentric circles: the exterior, like a cord of abacá, suggests the ship's rigging, the tool necessary for the crew to raise and lower the sails. The inner circle serves to concentrically divide the total circumference of the body. The internal part of these carries in its center the silhouette of Cuauhtémoc on her port side and with all the rigging, sailing to the west, driven by the wind, represents her first trip to Mexico from Spain. In the ring formed by the two circles there are two inscriptions: reading Armada de México (Mexican Navy) on the top, and Buque Escuela Cuauhtémoc (Cuauhtémoc School Ship), on the bottom.

The same ring offers, at the eastern point, the figure of the wind god Ehécatl, who with his breath propels the ship to the west. At the setting point appears the Sun of the evening twilight; at the north point, interspersed in the inscription, the sidereal stars that make constant knowledge of their position possible. Finally, in the upper part of the body, the eagle of the Mexican Coat of Arms, which recalls the origin of the ship and its strength.

== Figurehead ==
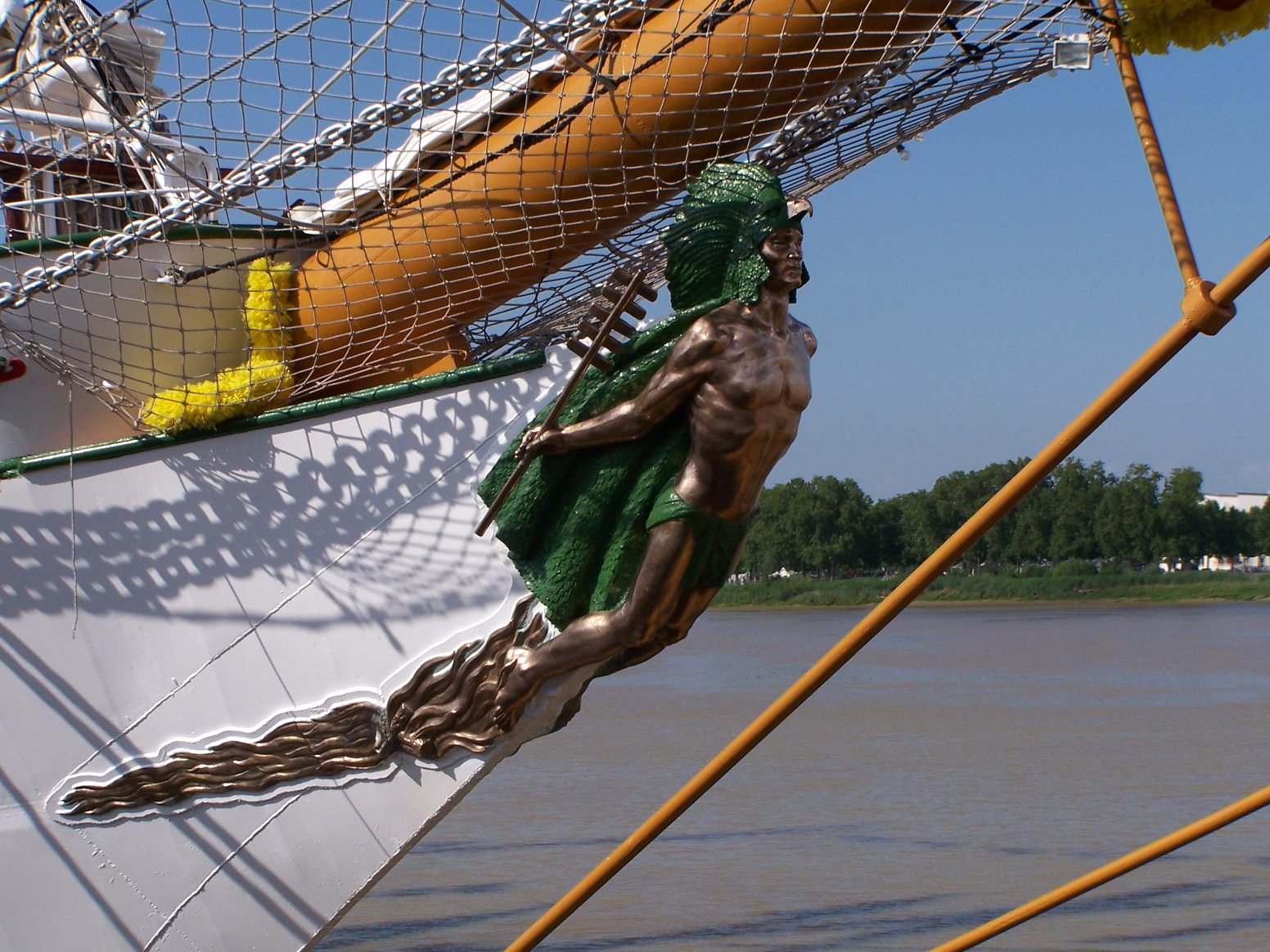
Figurehead of ARM Cuauhtémoc

The figurehead depicts Cuauhtémoc, the last Aztec emperor and namesake of the vessel. The name of this ship represents the warlike lineage of the Aztec emperor, who was also known for his bravery and his love of poetry. It was sculpted by Juan de Ávalos, considered one of the Spanish sculptors with the greatest passion for the human body.

== Cruises ==
- Atlantic Cruise 1982
- Oriente Cruise 1983
- Tahiti Cruise 1984
- North Atlantic Cruise 1985
- Liberty Cruise 1986
- South Pacific Cruise 1987
- Mediterranean Cruise 1988
- Eurocaribe Cruise 1989
- 1990 Circumnavigation Cruise
- 50th Anniversary Cruise of the Secretary of the Atlantic Navy 1992
- Cape Horn Cruise 1992–1993
- Cruise Europe 1994
- Canada Cruise 1994
- Baltic Cruise 1996
- Cruiser Osaka 1997
- Cruise Australia 1998
- Lisbon Cruise 1998
- 1999 North Sea Cruise
- Euroamerica 2000 Cruise
- Europe Cruise 2001
- 2002 Circumnavigation Cruise
- Rouen Cruise 2003
- Sail Rhode Island 2004
- 2005 North Pacific Training Cruise
- Circumnavigation Cruise 2006
- Baltic Instructional Cruise 2007
- Rouen Cruise 2008
- Japan Instructional Cruise 2009
- 2010 Bicentennial Sailing Instruction Cruise South America
- Mediterranean Cruise 2011
- Atlantic Cruise 2012
- Europe Cruise 2013
- Sail Latin America 2014
- Levante Mediterranean Cruise 2015
- Ibero Atlantic Cruise 2016
- Centennial Cruise of the 2017 Constitution
- Sail Latin America 2018
- Tricontinental Training Cruise 2024
- Consolidation Of Mexico's Independence 2025 Training Cruise

== Gallery ==
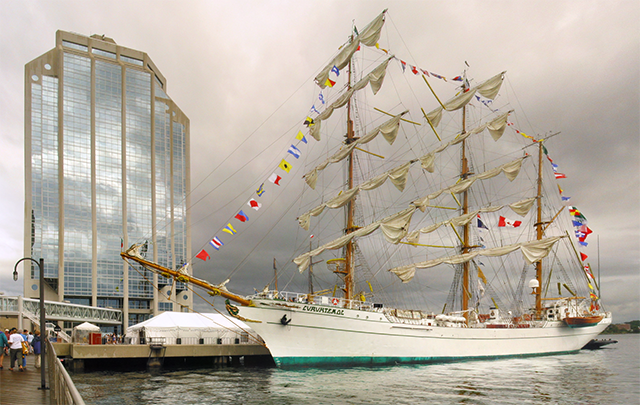
Cuauhtémoc at Halifax, Nova Scotia, 31 July 2004

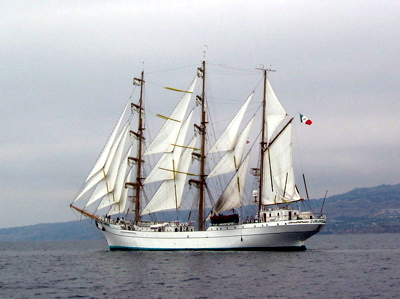
Cuauhtémoc at Los Angeles, 2005

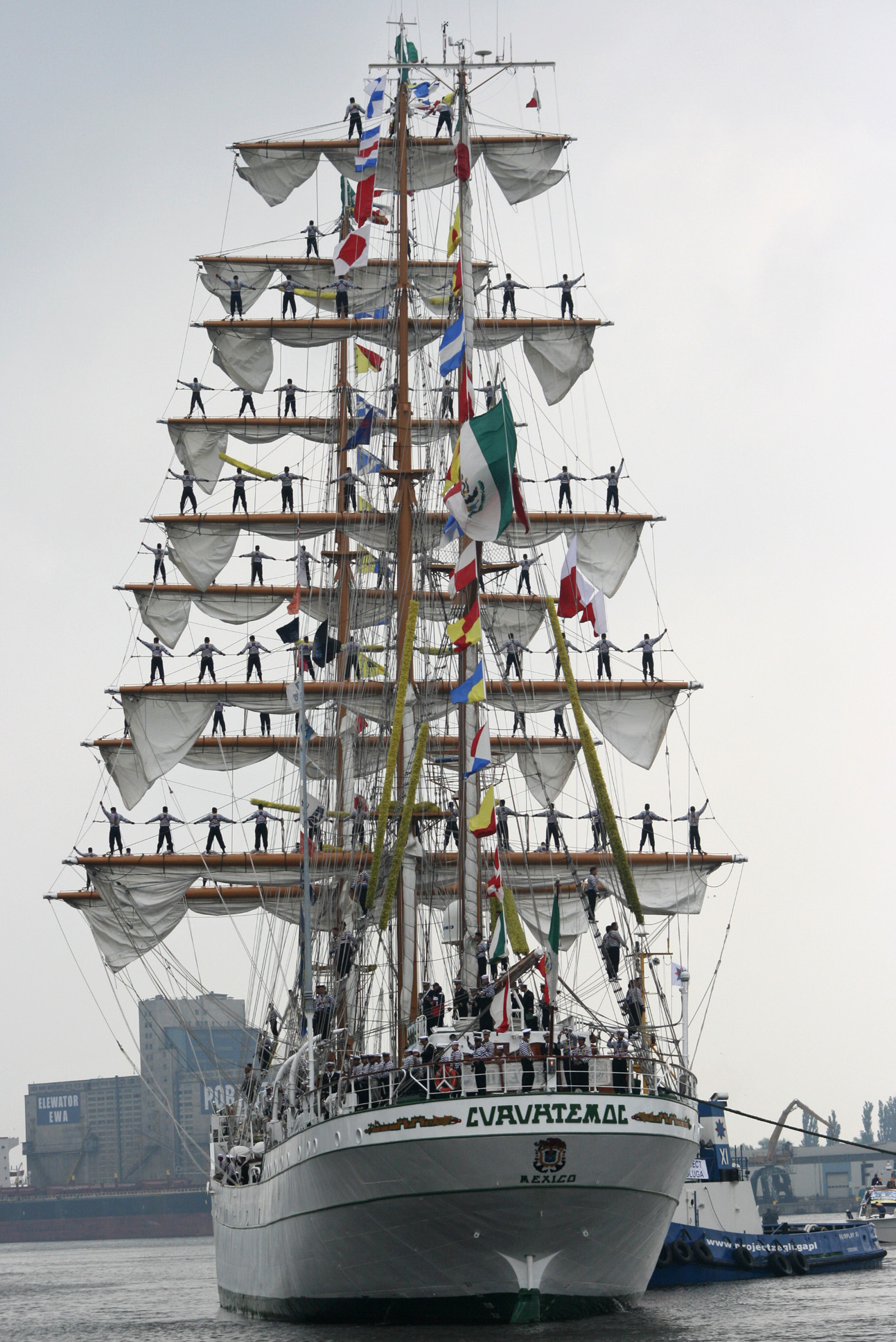
Sailors on the yards of Cuauhtémoc in 2007

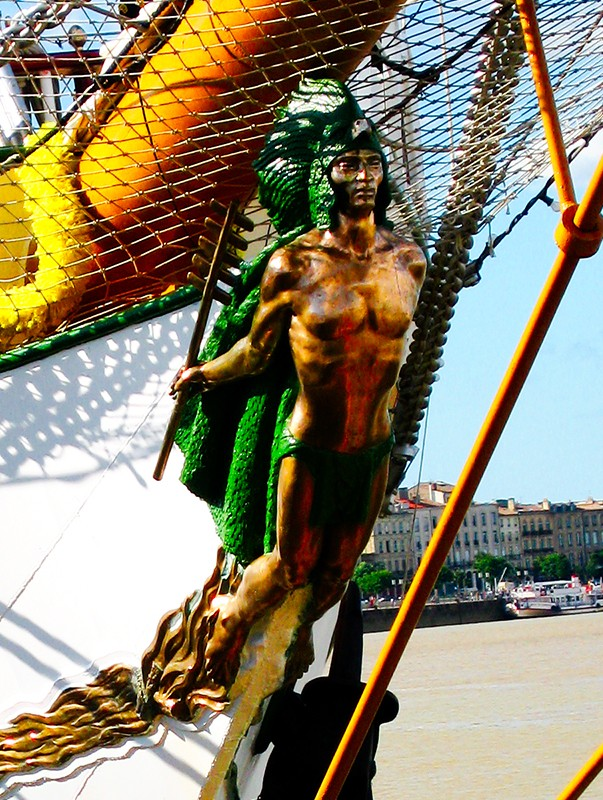
Figurehead of Cuauhtémoc in 2007

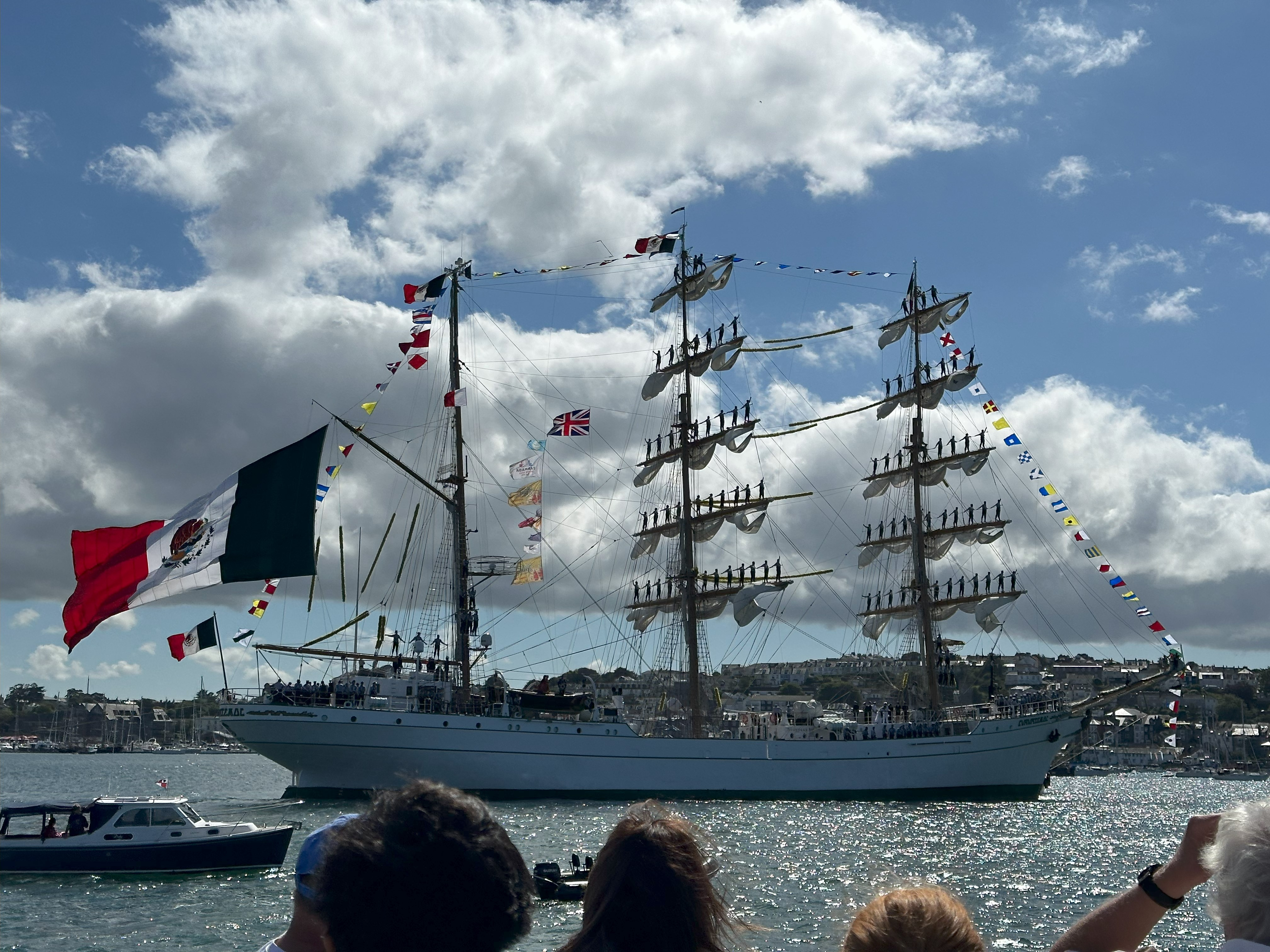
Cuauhtémoc setting off from Falmouth, August 2023, during a Tall Ship race.

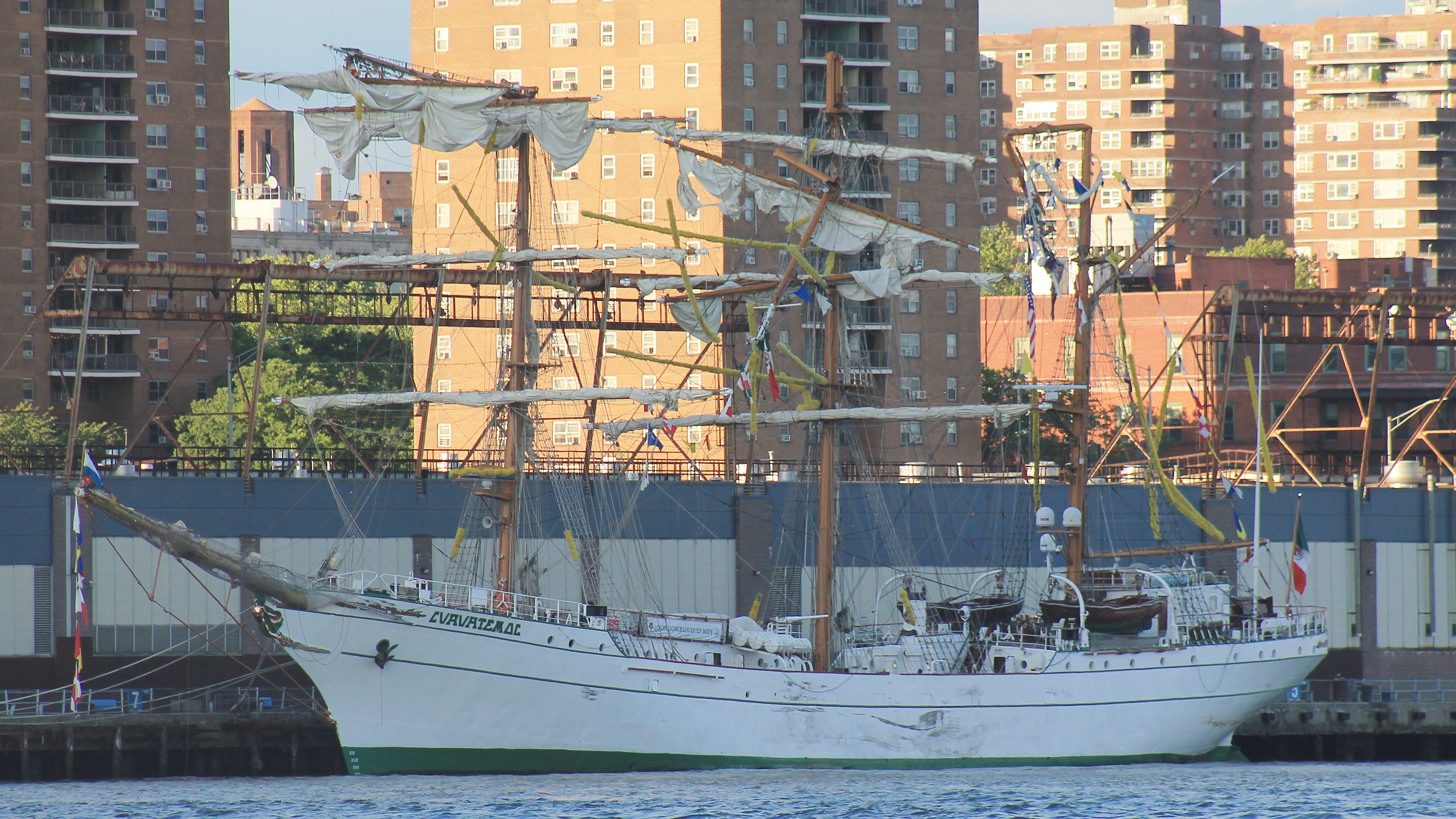
Cuauhtémoc docked at Pier 36 in Manhattan after colliding with the Brooklyn Bridge with damage to her masts visible, 18 May 2025.

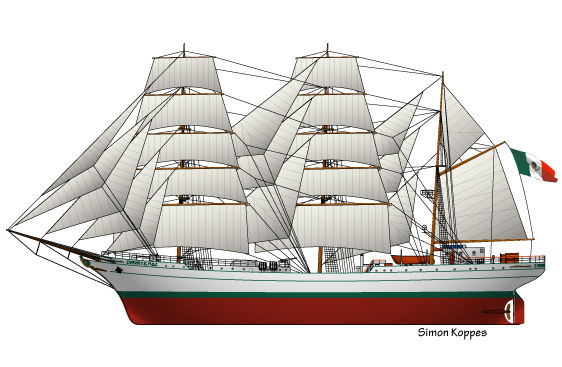
Line art of Cuauhtémoc
