= Great Chesapeake Bay Schooner Race =

Annual race in the United States

The Great Chesapeake Bay Schooner Race (GCBSR) is an annual schooner race established in 1990 that takes place on the Chesapeake Bay. The race—held in October of each year—begins just south of the Chesapeake Bay Bridge near Annapolis, Maryland, and ends at Thimble Shoal Light north of the Hampton Roads channel, covering 127 nautical miles (146 mi; 235 km). Pre- and post-race activities take place in Baltimore, Maryland, and Portsmouth, Virginia, respectively. Proceeds from the race support Chesapeake Bay education and preservation projects. The current time to beat is 11 hours, 1 minutes, 41 seconds and was set in 2017 by the schooner Virginia. The previous time to beat was 11 hours, 18 minutes, 53 seconds and was set in 2007 by the schooner Virginia.

== History ==
The race started as a challenge from Lane Briggs, the captain of the steel-hulled, sail-powered tugboat Norfolk Rebel, to Jan Miles, the captain of Pride of Baltimore II. The first official race was held in 1990.

== Results ==
Year	Class AA	Class A	Class B	Class C
2007	1. Virginia; 2. Pride of Baltimore II; 3. Lady Maryland	1. Woodwind; 2. Antonina; 3. Munequita	1. Adventurer 65; 2. Martha White; 3. Sally B	1. Quintessence; 2. Farewell; 3. Libertate
2008	1. Pride of Baltimore II; 2. Lady Maryland; 3. A. J. Meerwald	1. Heron; 2. Adventurer 56; 3. Prom Queen	1. Sally B 2. Mistress 58; 3. Dove II	1. Malabar II; 2. Green Dragon; 3. Windfall
2009	1. Lady Maryland; 2. Pride of Baltimore II; 3. Virginia	1. Prom Queen; 2. Woodwind; 3. Juno	1. Adventurer 65; 2. One World; 3. Sally B	1. Green Dragon; 2. Susan B Merryman; 3. Quintessence
2010	1. Summerwind; 2. Pride of Baltimore II; 3. Lynx	1. Adventurer 56; 2. Prom Queen; 3. Woodwind	1. Sally B 2. Russamee; 3. Martha White	1. Quintessence; 2. Rip Hudner; 3. Farewell
2017	1. Virginia; 2. Lady Maryland; 3. Pride of Baltimore II	1. Summerwind 78; 2. Woodwind; 3. Brilliant	1. Sally B 2. Tom Bombadil; 3. Libertate	1. Renegade; 2. Flower of Caithness; 3. Norfolk Rebel
2018	1. Sultana; 2. Columbia; 3. Lady Maryland	1. Hindu; 2. Woodwind; 3. Wolfhound	1. Libertate; 2. Sally B 3. Tom Bombadil	1. Sea Hawk; 2. Norfolk Rebel; 3. Flower of Caithness
