= Harvey Gamage =

Gaff rigged schooner launched in 1973

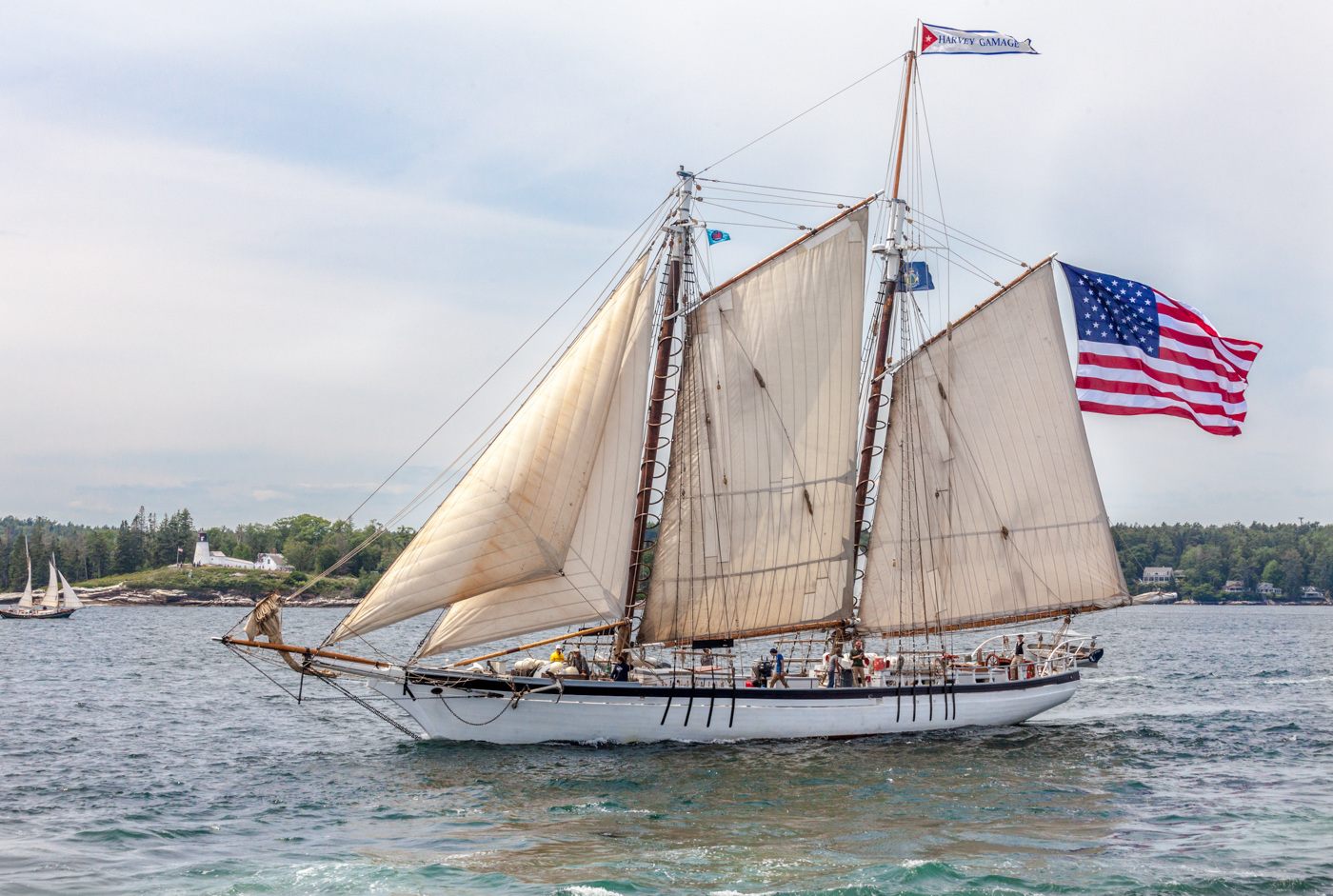
- Harvey Gamage under full sail off the coast of Maine

History

United States
- Ordered: 1972
- Laid down: Sept 11, 1972
- Launched: Sept 9, 1973
- Refit: 2014-2015

General characteristics
- Displacement: 94 Tonnes
- Length: 131 ft (40 m)
- Beam: 24 ft (7.3 m)
- Height: 91 ft (28 m)
- Draft: 9.6 ft (2.9 m)
- Propulsion: sail, 225 HP diesel
- Sail plan: Gaff rigged schooner

The Harvey Gamage is a 131' gaff rigged schooner launched in 1973 from the Harvey F. Gamage Shipyard in South Bristol, Maine. She was designed by McCurdy & Rhodes, Naval Architects in Cold Spring Harbor, New York and Frederick W. Bates of Damariscotta, Maine. She is a USCG inspected vessel both as a passenger vessel (subchapter T) and a sail training vessel (46 CFR 166 subchapter R-Nautical Schools). As governments of maritime countries recognise Sail Training as an essential component of developing and maintaining an essential merchant marine force, the US Congress created a special service category of vessel for Sail Training and the Harvey Gamage is one of a handful of vessels licensed for this service. She has been educating students at sea along the east coast of North American almost continuously since her launch. She has 14 staterooms accommodating 39 people, including 9 professional crew, 22 youth sail trainees and up to 4 adult chaperones. As a training vessel, she takes crews of students along the eastern seaboard, from her home port in Maine to various destinations ranging from The Maritimes to the Caribbean

== Design and construction ==
In 1871, Albion and Menzies Gamage purchased a lot of land in South Bristol, Maine and constructed the A&M Gamage Shipyard which remained in the family until 2000. In 1924, Harvey F. Gamage left his apprenticeship at East Boothbay, ME boatyards and set up business for himself in a small shed on the Gamage shipyard, where he oversaw construction of more than 288 vessels, including many schooners designed by naval architect, John Alden.

In the early 1970s, Dirigo Cruises, under the directorship of Eben M. Whitcomb Jr., hired Gamage to build a schooner. Gamage enlisted the services of the firm of McCurdy & Rhodes, accompanied by Frederick Bates to do the general design work, and on September 11, 1972, the keel was laid and work began with a crew of 10 men. Marriner Lumber Co. of Brunswick provided the hull material (double sawn oak) and the masts were Maine fir. The deck was 2.5 inches of oak and fir with 3.5 inches of sheer strake. The 4200 square feet of sail was provided by Clarence Hale and Son of Sargentsville. On September 9, 1973, the Schooner Harvey Gamage was launched for a total cost of $350,000. R. Kenneth Hamilton of Nobleboro was an investor in Dirigo Cruises, worked at the Gamage Shipyard during the construction of the Harvey Gamage, and served as a well loved and respected Captain of the Harvey Gamage for many years.

The ship was extensively refitted in 1994 and again in 2014–2015.

== Ownership ==
The vessel was contracted by Dirigo Cruises, a collaborative enterprise created by Eben Whitcomb of Ellsworth, Maine. In 1971, Whitcomb placed an ad in The New York Times seeking investors to build a schooner for educational purposes. In keeping with the old time tradition of 'limited partnership of 64ths', Dirigo Cruises was owned by 14 partners with Whitcomb as the General Partner. After her launch in 1973, Whitcomb took delivery and under the initial guidance of Captain James Payne of Brunswick, ME, the Gamage sailed the Northwest Atlantic Ocean and Caribbean Sea with high school and college students as well as paying passengers. In 1994, she was purchased by Challenge Inc., managed by David and Arden Brink, who ran sea education programs on Harvey Gamage and SSV Mystic Clipper. In 1996, management of the ship transferred to the Harvey Gamage Foundation, a Damariscotta, ME-based nonprofit that provided educational semester-at-sea programs, managed by Alix Thorne and Bert Rogers. They subsequently renamed the organization Ocean Classroom Foundation, and operated her alongside SSV Westward and SSV Spirit of Massachusetts. During this time, Ocean Classrooms became one of the most successful sail training programs in the United States.

On August 31, 2014, Ocean Classroom Foundation shut down due to residual troubles dating to the 2008 financial crisis, and negotiations with the major creditor resulted in the vessel being transferred to Portland Yacht Services of Portland, ME. Ocean Classroom Foundation executive director Greg Belanger entered an agreement with Phineas Sprague Jr, owner of Portland Yacht Services, to preserve the Gamage. Working with Sprague, in 2015 Belanger created Ocean Passages to provide the Harvey Gamage as a resource for educators to run their own programs and curriculum. Portland Yacht Services, as steward, conducted a major rebuild in 2014–15 with the intention of having the vessel continue service with a nonprofit under a demise charter as a Sailing School Vessel (SSV).

== Operation ==
Starting in 2015, Harvey Gamage spent summers in Maine and winters in Cuba with a special OFAC License and permission of the Cuban Government. In February 2018, Gamage departed Cuba and began running 10-day sail training programs for 25 students, from Key West to Tampa, organized by Sailing Ships Maine (then operating as Tall Ships Portland). Following this, Gamage was chartered by World Ocean School for the month of June 2018 and then operated by Sailing Ships Maine for the summer of 2018 and 2019. Sailing Ships Maine chartered Gamage in July 2020 and expanded from 1-week sail training programs in summer to include Semesters at Sea programs. The first Semester at Sea ran in fall of 2020, followed by three more in 2021. She continues to sail year-round in partnership with Sailing Ships Maine who run youth programs out of their home port in Portland, ME.

Some of the longest running sail training programs in the United States originated on Gamage, and she has been the focus of many creative art projects and books.

== See also ==
- List of large sailing yachts
- List of schooners
- Tall Ships America
