= Appledore =

Appledore may refer to:

== Places ==
=== England ===
- Appledore, Kent
  - Appledore (Kent) railway station
- Appledore, Mid Devon, near Tiverton
- Appledore, Torridge, North Devon, near Bideford

=== United States ===
- Appledore Island, off the coast of Maine

=== In fiction ===
- Appledore, a fictional house in "His Last Vow", an episode of the BBC TV series Sherlock

== Ships and shipbuilding ==
- Appledore II, schooner based in Camden, Maine
- Appledore Shipbuilders, a company in Devon, England
- HMS Appledore (1919), minesweeper

== Other ==
- Appledore F.C., a football club based in Appledore, Torridge

== See also ==
- Apeldoorn, a city in the Netherlands
