= Cuauhtémoc–Brooklyn Bridge collision =

2025 ship collision in New York City, U.S.

Cuauhtémoc Brooklyn Bridge collision
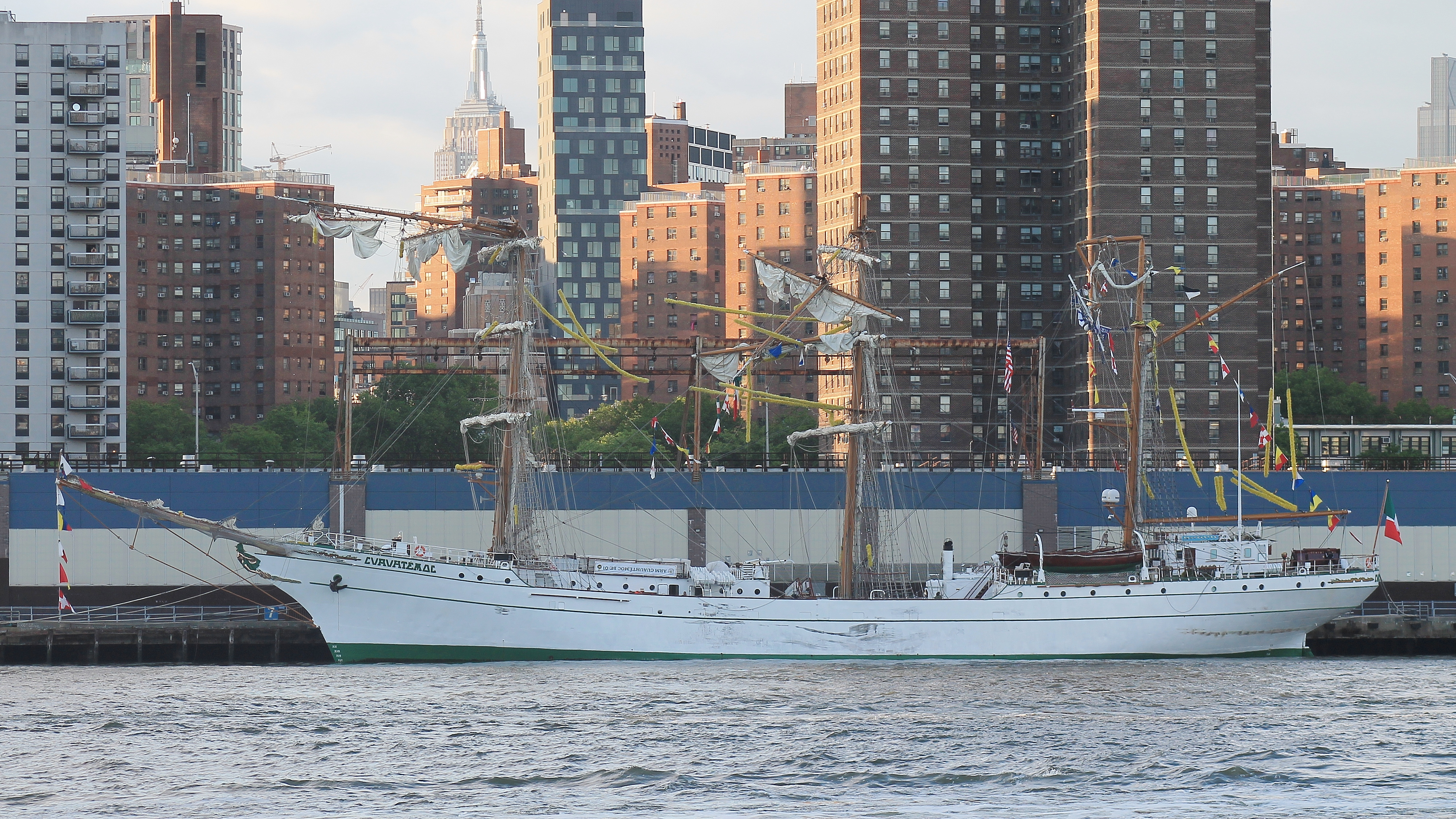
- The damaged Cuauhtémoc seen the day after the collision
- Date: May 17, 2025
- Time: 8:26 p.m. (EDT)
- Location: Brooklyn Bridge, New York City, New York, United States; 40°42′16″N 73°59′42″W
- Cause: Collision with bridge structure following propulsion malfunction
- Participants: Mexican Navy tall ship Cuauhtémoc
- Outcome: Mast collapse, multiple injuries and deaths
- Deaths: 2
- Injuries: 25 injured (two critical)
- Property damage: Damage to ship masts, no damage to bridge
- Inquiries: Pending

On May 17, 2025, the Mexican Navy ship Cuauhtémoc struck the Brooklyn Bridge while departing New York City. The ship's masts collided with the underside of the bridge, at around the height of her topgallant sails, causing the loss of her topmasts and resulting in two deaths and multiple injuries of people aboard the vessel.

== Background ==
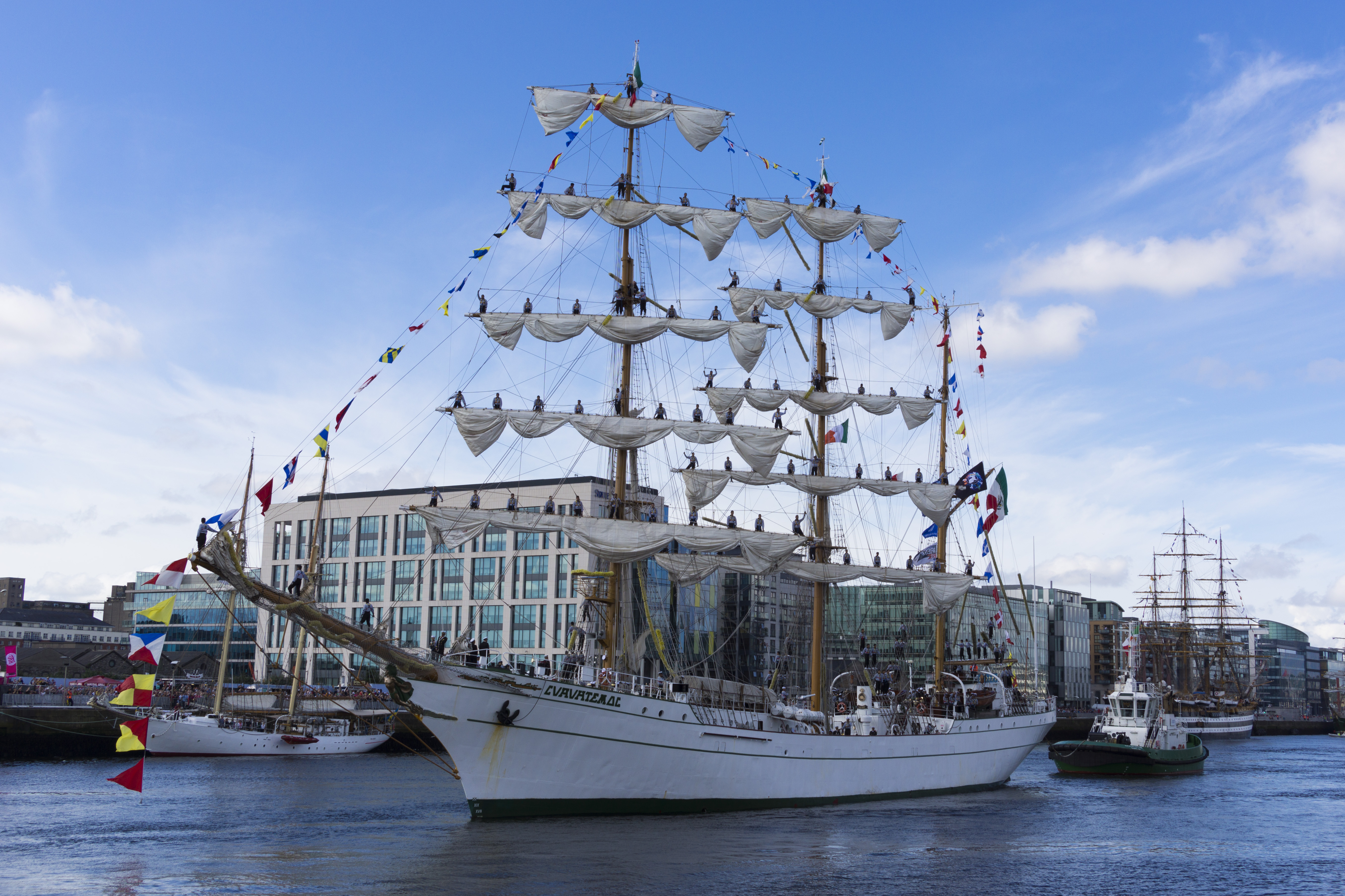
ARM Cuauhtémoc, the Mexican Navy ship involved in the collision, seen on 26 August 2012

Cuauhtémoc is a sail training vessel of the Mexican Navy, often used on international goodwill tours. According to the Maritimes Museum, Cuauhtémoc, originally named Celaya, was designed in 1981 as part of a series of sister ships that would be used by various Ibero-American navies before sailing for the first time from Spain to Mexico in July 1982.

The ship's training cruise, titled the "Consolidation of Mexican Independence 2025," marked the celebration of the expulsion of the final Spanish stronghold at San Juan de Ulúa from Mexican territory in 1825 by the Mexican Navy under the command of Pedro Sainz de Baranda.

On April 4, 2025, Cuauhtémoc departed from Acapulco. It was then docked at South Street Seaport as the third stop of its planned eight-month trip from May 13 to 17 of that year, which was also a part of a routine visit. At the time of the incident, Cuauhtémoc was on a training cruise, which takes place annually and was scheduled to visit again for America's 250th anniversary on July 4, 2026. The ship has a listed height of 147 feet (45 m).

The Brooklyn Bridge, a suspension bridge completed in 1883, spans the East River between Manhattan and Brooklyn in New York City. Its vertical clearance is 127 feet (39 m).

The ship was scheduled to visit 22 ports in 15 nations over the course of 170 days.

== Incident ==
The collision took place at approximately 8:26 p.m. EDT (00:26 UTC) on May 17, when Cuauhtémoc was reversing out of dock into the river from South Street Seaport. For unknown reasons, the ship did not maneuver as planned, and travelled backwards under the nearby Brooklyn Bridge, crashing into the span. Wilson Aramboles, the New York Police Department's Special Operations Chief, said that Cuauhtémoc was intended to head out to sea, but ended up traveling in the wrong direction and instead moved toward the Brooklyn Bridge. Just before the collision, the ship was seen moving quickly astern.

The NTSB preliminary report was released on June 30, 2025. It states that as Cuauhtémoc was being let go from the dock, instructions were given in a chain relay; "The docking pilot gave astern commands to the captain on the conning deck, which were acknowledged by the captain, translated to Spanish, and relayed to another crewmember on the deck below, outside of the navigation bridge. This crew member then relayed the orders to crewmembers within the navigation bridge, where commands were inputted." The ship initially departed the dock at around 2.5 knots after her lines were let go at 8:16. The report then indicates that the ship was moving as expected at this point; "Between 20:20 and 20:22, the Cuauhtémoc moved astern and away from Pier 17 at 2.5 knots. Once clear of the slip, the docking pilot gave a stop command, gave a dead-slow-ahead order". The pilot then gave further instructions to the Charles D. McAllister tugboat to reposition on the starboard side of the Cuauhtémoc.

After the Charles D. McAllister had repositioned herself, the pilot continued to give ahead orders to the Cuauhtémoc, saying that "As the crew of the tug took their line in, the docking pilot ordered additional commands in the ahead direction." It is at this point that the first movement towards the Brooklyn Bridge is noted, with the report saying that as "The Charles D. McAllister began pushing on the starboard bow of the Cuauhtémoc. The stern of the Cuauhtémoc began to swing toward the Brooklyn Bridge." The pilot ordered the Charles D. McAllister to stand off, and move towards the starboard stern of the Cuauhtémoc. It is at this point that the report notes that "Between 20:23 and 20:24, the vessel’s astern speed increased from 3.3 knots to 5.1 knots, and the harbor pilot called for nearby tugboat assistance."

Videos show the ship's three masts impacting the bridge one by one and breaking off, at around the height of her topgallant sails, and the ship continuing on and scraping along the waterfront revetment. There were 227 people on board at the time. The impact caused significant damage to the ship's masts, the deaths of two crew members, and injuries to multiple other crew members, three of whom were reported in critical condition. Additionally, several sailors were spotted hanging onto the damaged masts, though none fell into the river. The two fatalities were identified as cadets from the states of Veracruz and Oaxaca. One of them was standing on top of the rigging at the time of the collision.

== Emergency response ==
Emergency responders, including units from the FDNY, NYPD Harbor Unit, and United States Coast Guard, arrived shortly after the collision. The injured were transported to nearby medical facilities.

== Aftermath ==
Immediately after the collision, the vessel was held at dock while the Mexican Navy, in coordination with U.S. authorities, assessed the damage. The Mexican Secretariat of the Navy issued a public statement confirming the collision and promising transparency during the ongoing review. The Brooklyn Bridge sustained no major structural damage, though all lanes on both sides were briefly closed before reopening at 10:30 p.m. The New York City Department of Transportation did not issue specific statements on the bridge's status, but routine maintenance closures were scheduled shortly after the incident. According to a spokesperson, New York City mayor Eric Adams was briefed on the collision and was expected to travel to the incident; he held a press conference at the South Street Seaport an hour after the incident.

The Cuauhtémoc returned to Mexico on 23 November 2025 and was received at an official ceremony in Veracruz.

== Investigation ==
As of May 2025, the National Transportation Safety Board is investigating the incident. The Mexican Navy said it would conduct an internal inquiry.
