= Fisherman's staysail =

Type of sail

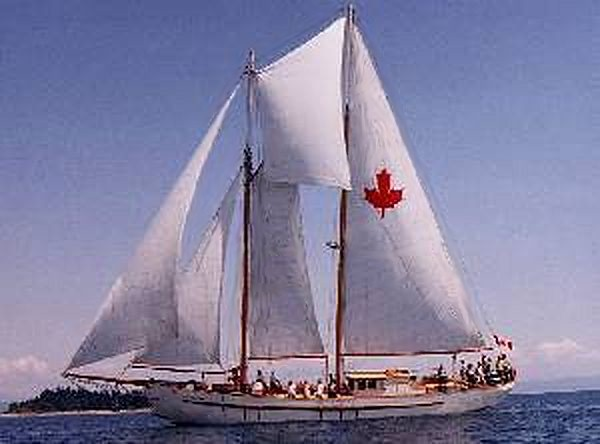
The schooner Maple Leaf. The fisherman is the trapezoidal sail between the two masts

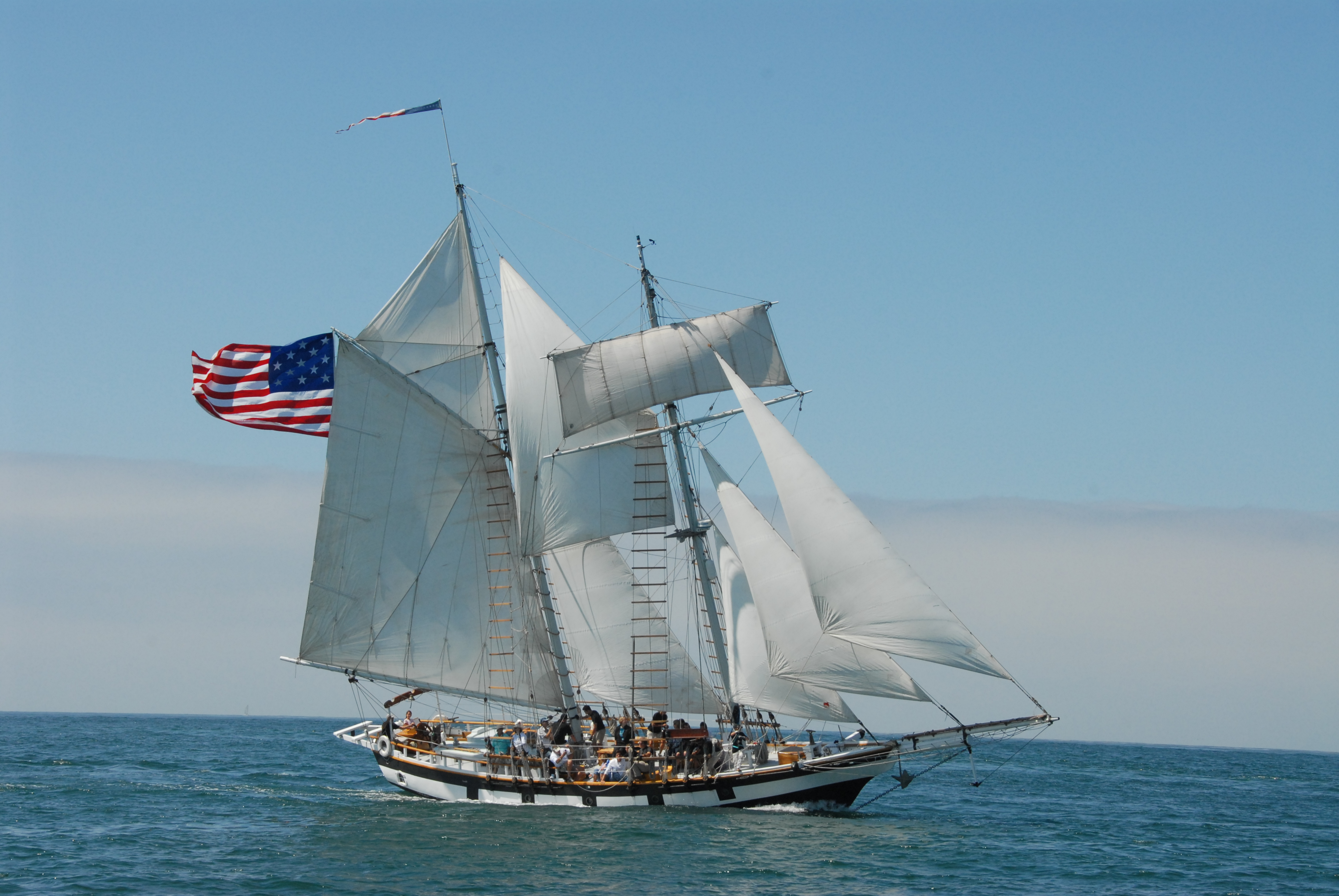
Fisherman set in-between the masts on the topsail schooner, Amazing Grace

A fisherman staysail is a sail placed between the fore and main masts of a sailing ship, usually a schooner but also including brigantines.

All four of its sides are typically set flying, although the luff may be attached to the mast (possibly with in-mast furling) on a staysail schooner. The purpose of a fisherman staysail is to catch light winds aloft, as it is a large sail set high on the masts. In some rigs, it overlaps other sails and spars such as the gaff of the foresail and therefore must be fully lowered and re-raised at every tack and jibe. Because of this, a fisherman staysail is unusual on a gaff schooner, but on a staysail schooner, the fisherman staysail is a useful way to fill the upper gap between the masts. A fisherman staysail is mainly suitable in light to medium airs; in strong winds it does little more than heel the vessel.
