= Amazing Grace (ship) =

Topsail schooner ship

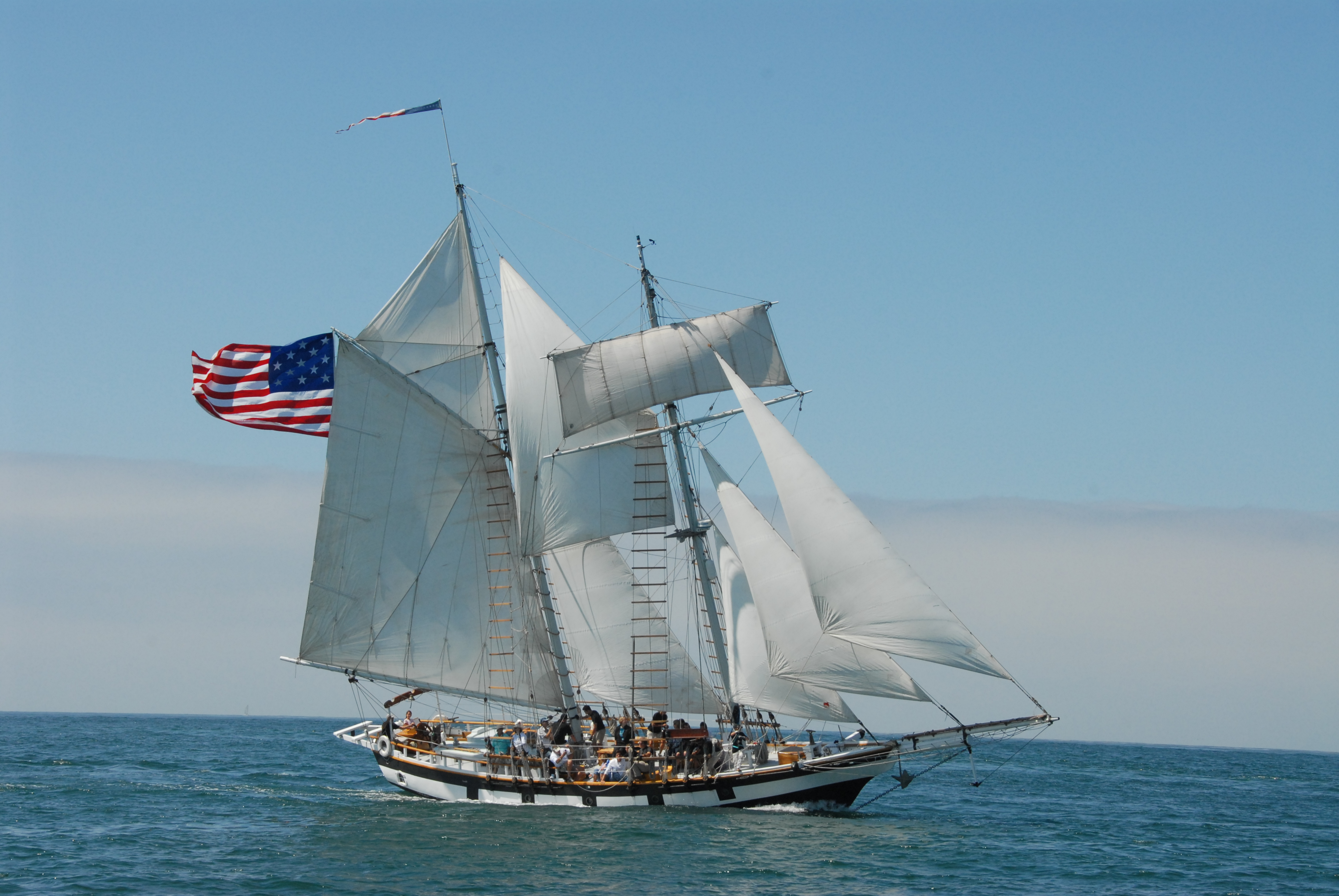
- Amazing Grace sailing in the Pacific

History

United States
- Name: Tuolumne; Amazing Grace
- Operator: East Island Excursions, Inc.
- Builder: Don McQuiston
- Launched: October 25, 1989
- Completed: 1991
- Home port: San Juan, Puerto Rico
- Motto: Refresh others and you will be refreshed

General characteristics
- Type: Topsail schooner
- Tonnage: 30 tons
- Length: 83 ft (25 m) sparred length; 60 ft (18 m) on deck
- Beam: 16 ft (4.9 m)
- Height: 70 ft (21 m)
- Draft: 6 ft 9 in (2.06 m)
- Propulsion: 3 blade feathering propeller
- Sail plan: 2,010 sq ft (187 m^{2}) sail area; Baltimore Clipper
- Capacity: 30
- Crew: 5

Amazing Grace is an 83-foot (25 m) topsail schooner. Its home port is in San Juan, Puerto Rico. The ship serves as the platform for the non-profit organization Maritime Leadership and is also available for private charters and memorials at sea. Maritime Leadership provides traditional sail training adventures through sailings ranging from 3–48 hours.

== History ==
Like other schooners, Amazing Grace is the traditional American sailing craft. The original name was Tuolumne, named after a river in Yosemite National Park. The ship was designed by Don McQuiston with engineering by Don Patterson, NA, and was built on the Steven's Ranch, a cattle operation east of Del Mar, California, by Don McQuiston and his son Donnie. Upon completion it was hauled to The Knight & Carver Boatyard on San Diego's Mission Bay and launched on October 25, 1989.

The nine spars were shaped from old growth Douglas fir shipped from a mill in Washington. The ship was originally rigged as a brigantine carrying three yards on the foremast. The bowsprit, jib boom, and dolphin striker which carry three sails; the mainmast is gaff rigged with mainsail and gaff topsail; between the masts is the main staysail and fisherman. Seventeen months later the ship went for a first sail in 20 knot winds off San Diego. In 1994, with a crew of six, the ship sailed north for Bellingham, WA, and then cruised the San Juan Islands, participated in Tall Ships events, raced with schooners up the British Columbia coast and one trip to Alaska.
