= Appledore II =

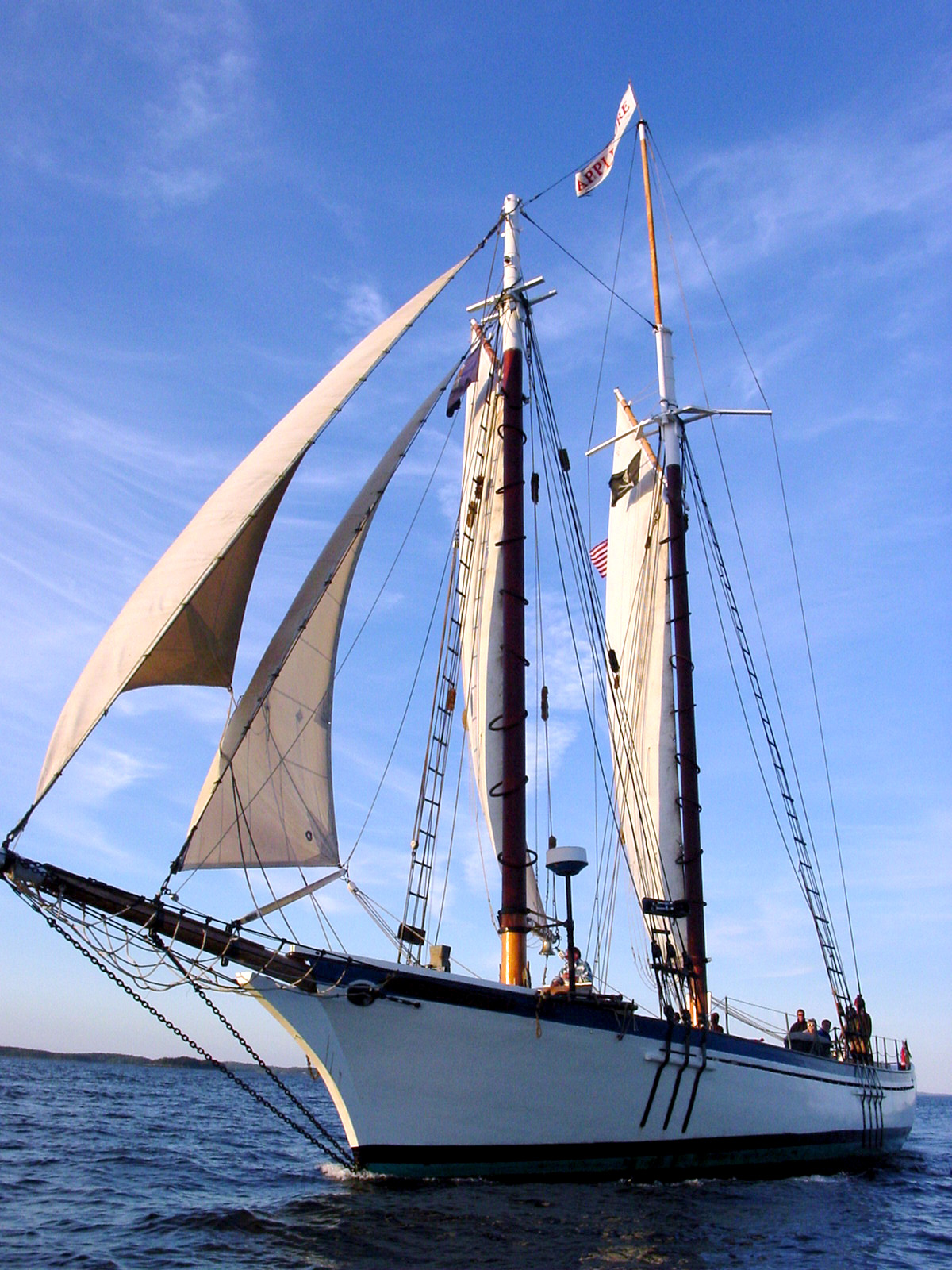

History

United States
- Name: Appledore II
- Owner: John P. McKean, S.E.A., Ltd.
- Builder: Linwood Gamage, Gamage Shipyard
- Launched: August 22, 1978
- Home port: Camden, Maine

General characteristics
- Type: Schooner
- Displacement: 52 tons
- Length: 86 ft (26 m) overall, 65 ft (20 m) on deck
- Beam: 18 ft 9 in (5.72 m)
- Draft: 10 ft (3.0 m)
- Propulsion: Sail, auxiliary engine
- Sail plan: Gaff-rigged, two-masted topsail schooner
- Speed: 10.5-knot (19.4 km/h) hull speed
- Complement: 49 passengers, 4 crew

Appledore II is a traditional two-masted wooden schooner, currently privately owned and operated out of Camden, Maine and Key West, Florida.

== Construction ==
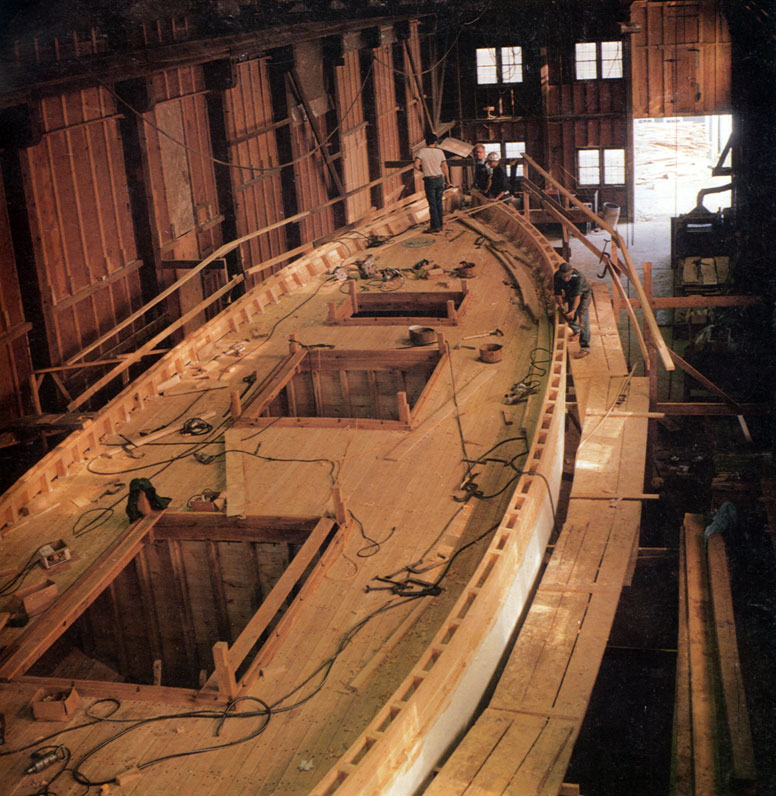
Appledore II under construction

Launched on August 22, 1978, Appledore II is the largest of her four sister ships, Appledore I, III, IV, and V. Appledore II was the last schooner custom built by the Harvey Gamage Shipyard in South Bristol, Maine, which had previously built the tall ships Mary Day, Harvey Gamage, Shenandoah, Bowdoin and Spirit of Massachusetts, among others. Designed by Bud McIntosh, she was structured to endure heavy weather and the open ocean.

Appledore II is gaff rigged on both her masts, with a hull speed of 10.5 knots and a length of 86 feet (26 m) overall.

== Maiden voyage ==
Her maiden voyage was an 18-month circumnavigation, which commenced in November 1978 from Portsmouth, New Hampshire and concluded there after the Appledore II visited many ports of call around the world. This voyage has been chronicled in two books, Dreams of Natural Places, A New England Schooner Odyssey and Sailing Three Oceans, both authored by Herbert Smith.

== Today ==
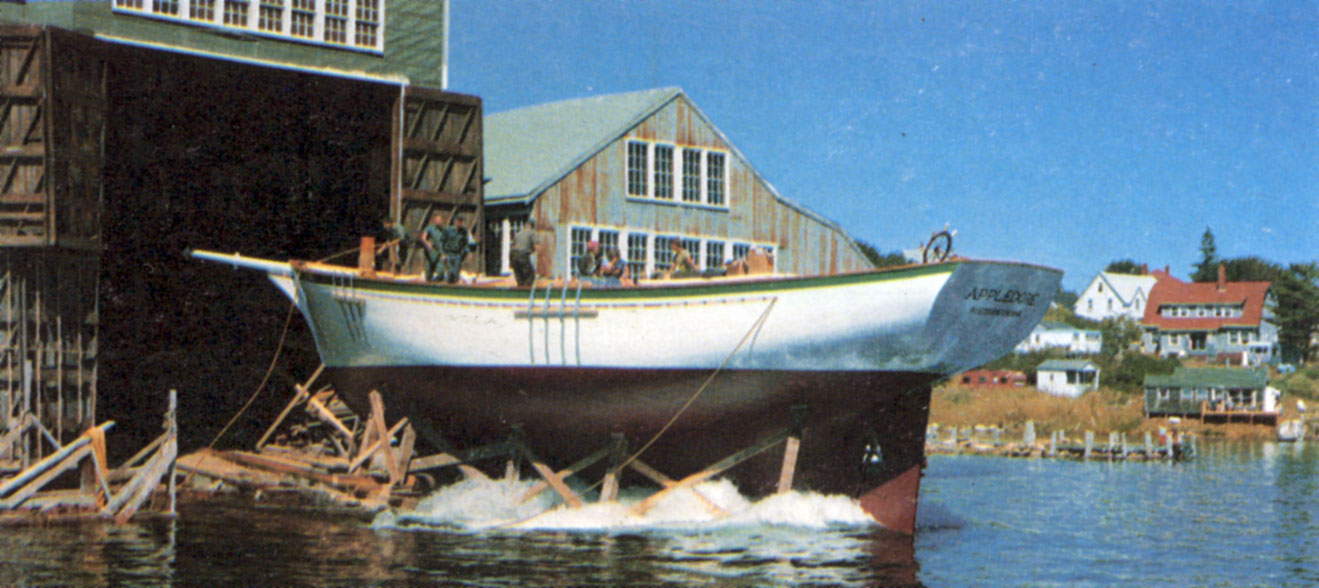
The launch of Appledore II

Since that time, Appledore II has sailed extensively throughout the Caribbean, conducting educational and private tourism. For a number of years she served as the SEAmester vessel for marine biology majors from Southampton College. Since 1988 she has been offering day sails from her home ports of Camden, Maine and Key West, Florida. Twice a year, Appledore II makes a 2,000-mile (3,200 km) offshore voyage between these destinations. As a prime example of a historical wooden schooner, the Appledore II is regularly featured in books, movies, advertisements, and post cards evoking traditional coastal Maine sailing. The Appledore II regularly participates in the Key West Wrecker's Cup Race (a regatta she has won on numerous occasions) and is a mainstay of the annual Windjammer Weekend in Camden, Maine.
