= Tall Ships Challenge =

The Tall Ships Challenge is an annual event organized by Tall Ships America alternating in a three year cycle between the Great Lakes, the Pacific and the Atlantic coasts of North America. The event draws hundreds of thousands of people to witness tall ships from the age of sail and allows participants to interact with the crews of different vessels in friendly rivalries as they race from port to port.

The series began in 2001 on the Great Lakes and saw vessels from six countries and visited seven US and Canadian ports. Since its launch, the series has visited dozens of North American cities, bringing millions of spectators down to the waterfront to experience the tall ships and creating a cumulative economic impact of hundreds of millions of dollars for host communities. It has continued to grow every year and is an eagerly anticipated event in the seaside communities that host the vessels (see, for example Philadelphia's Summer Sail 2007)and beyond.

Each year, the challenge is designated a Marine Event of National Significance by the US Coast Guard.

In 2026 tall ships will take part in the 250th anniversary of the USA in cities along the Atlantic coastline.

== Great Lakes ==
In the years 2001, 2004, 2007, 2010, 2013, 2016, 2019, 2022 and 2025 tall ships sailed during July and August between six to seven ports along the Canadian and U.S. shores of the Great Lakes.

== See also ==
- American Sail Training Association
- Cutty Sark Tall Ships' Race
- Sail training
- Tall ship
