= Tall Ships America =

Sail training association

- Type: Nonprofit organization 501(c)(3) organization
- Industry: Education; Sail training
- Predecessor: American Sail Training Association
- Founded: April 3, 1973; 53 years ago
- Founder: Barclay H. Warburton III
- Headquarters: Newport, Rhode Island
- Key people: Simon Colley, Stuart Gilfillen
- Website: www.tallshipsamerica.org

Tall Ships America, previously known as the American Sail Training Association (ASTA), is the largest sail training association in the world and a founding member of Sail Training International. From starting with a handful of vessels sailing the New England waters, Tall Ships America has grown into an international institution with more than 250 tall ships and sail training vessels representing 25 different countries and navigating all the world's oceans. TSA was founded on April 3, 1973, by Barclay H. Warburton III, following his return from the Tall Ships Races in Europe in 1972 where he joined the USCGC Eagle with his brigantine Black Pearl as the first US vessels to participate in the races.

== Mission ==
A nonprofit 501(c)(3) organization, Tall Ships America's mission is to

- encourage character building and seamanship through sail training
- promote sail training to the North American public
- support education under sail.

Tall Ships America organizes the Tall Ships Challenge®, a series of sail training races, rallies and maritime festivals that rotate every three years around

1. the Atlantic Ocean
2. the Pacific Ocean
3. the Great Lakes and coasts of North America.

In 2025, the Tall Ships Challenge series was held in the Great Lakes with stops in Brockville, Ontario, Toronto, Ontario, Duluth, Minnesota, Detroit, Michigan, Midland, Ontario and Erie, Pennsylvania.

== Member vessels ==
As of 2025 member vessels include:

- A.J Meerwald
- ARGIA
- Abbyey Road
- Adirondack
- Adirondack II
- Adirondack III
- Adventure
- Adventuress
- Alabama
- Alliance
- America 2.0
- American Pride
- American Promise
- Appledore IV
- Aquidneck
- Arabella
- Bagheera
- Bay Lady
- Bill of Rights
- Bluenose II
- Bowdowin
- Brilliant
- Californian
- Charles W. Morgan
- Christeen
- Clearwater
- Crowith Cramer
- Dennis Sullivan
- USCGC Eagle
- Elissa
- Empire Sandy
- Ernestina-Morriseey
- Exy Johnson
- Fair Jeanne
- Freda B
- Freedom Schooner Amistad
- Friendship of Salem
- Geronimo
- Glenn L. Swetman
- Godspped
- Hawaiian Chieftan
- Huron Jewel
- Inland Seas
- Irving Johnson
- Issac H. Evans
- Jolly II Rover
- Kalmar Nyckel
- Lady Maryland
- Lady Washington
- Lettie G. Howard
- Liberty Clipper
- Liberty Star
- Lynx
- Madeline
- Makani Olu (Gracious Wind)
- Manitou
- Maryland Dove
- Matthew Turner
- Mayflower II
- Mildred Belle
- Mystic Whaler
- NAO Trinidad
- Neptun
- North Wind
- Ocean Queen V
- Orion
- Pioneer
- Pride of Baltimore
- Providence
- Robert C. Seamans
- Roseway
- S/V Carlyn
- STV Argo
- STV Black Jack
- STV Ocean Star
- STV Vela
- San Salvador
- Schooner Apple Jack (formerly the Lazy Jack)
- Schooner Appledore II
- Schooner Appledore Star
- Schooner Eastwind
- Scout
- Scrimshaw
- Seaward
- Shenandoah
- Sigsbee
- Soundwaters
- Spirit of Bermuda
- Spirit of Buffalo
- Stad Amsterdam
- Star of India (ship)
- Sultana
- Summer Wind
- Suncoast Horizon
- Surprise
- Susan Constant
- Swift
- Swift of Ipswich
- Tabor Boy
- Tall Ships Windy
- The Spirit of South Carolina
- Timberwind
- U.S. Bring Niagra
- USS Constellation
- USS Constitution
- Virginia
- Wavertree
- Wendameen
- When and If
- Wonder
- Zeeto
- Zodiac

== Awards ==
Every year Tall Ships America awards several prizes including:

- Lifetime Achievement Award
- Michael J. Rauworth Leadership Award
- Sail Trainer of the Year Award
- Nancy Richardson Volunteer of the Year Award
- Captain Frank J. Bailey National Maritime Excellence Fund Sail Training Program of the Year Award.
- Sail Training Program of the Year
- Sea Education Program of the Year
- Tall Ships Challenge® Port of the Year
- Perry Bowl- Top Finishing Tall Ships America Member Vessel in TALL SHIPS CHALLENGE® Race Series
