= Staysail =

Type of ship sail

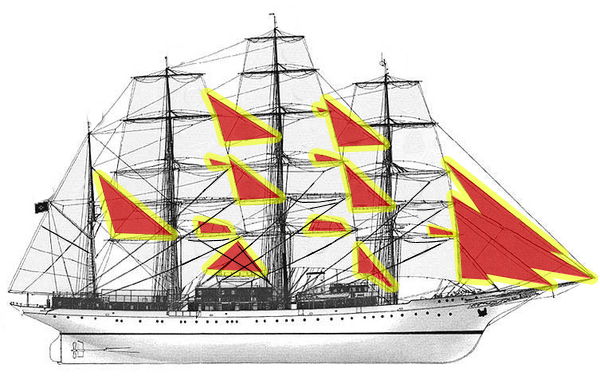
Staysails

A staysail ("stays'l") is a fore-and-aft rigged sail whose luff is affixed to a stay running forward (and most often but not always downwards) from a mast to the deck, the bowsprit, or to another mast.

== Description ==
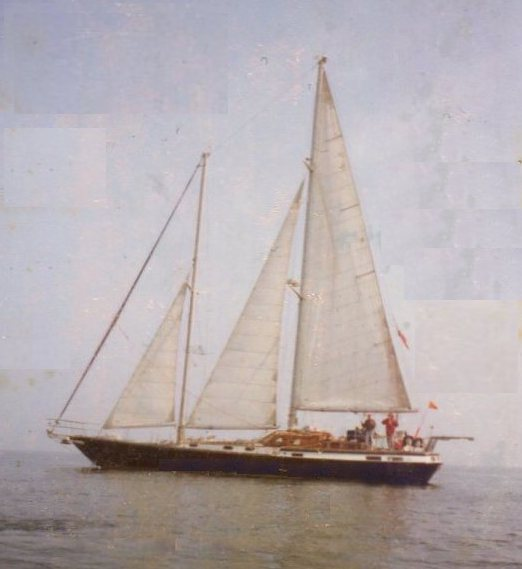
Staysail schooner "Rich Harvest" becalmed. Its large genoa jib has been roller-furled, and its quadrilateral Fisherman staysail is still in a sailbag.

Most staysails are triangular; however, some are four-cornered, notably some fisherman's staysails.

Triangular staysails set forward of the foremost mast are called jibs, headsails, or foresails. The innermost such sail on a cutter, schooner, and many other rigs having two or more foresails is referred to simply as the staysail, while the others are referred to as jibs, flying jibs, etc.

Types of staysail include the tallboy staysail (a narrow staysail carried between the spinnaker and the mainsail on racing yachts), the genoa staysail (a larger one carried inside the spinnaker when broad reaching), and the bigboy staysail (another name for the shooter or blooper, carried on the leeward side of the spinnaker). Unlike the cutter staysail, none of these sails have their luff affixed to a stay.

On large rigs, staysails other than headsails are named according to the mast and mast section on which they are hoisted. Thus, the staysail hoisted on a stay that runs forward and downwards from the top of the mizzen topgallant mast is the mizzen topgallant staysail. If two staysails are hoisted to different points on this mast, they would be the mizzen upper topgallant staysail and the mizzen lower topgallant staysail.

== Uses ==
In square rigged ships the staysails can help in tacking, overcoming the lumbering square sails' tendency to prevent bearing up to windward, especially in light winds. Where a ship attempts to tack but fails and has to bear away again on the original tack, she is said to have missed her stays. In cutter rigged yachts the genoa will often need to be furled before changing tack due to the difficulty in passing the big sail between the two forestays. Here the staysail can help bring the bow through the wind more effectively.

In addition to providing more overall sailing force, a staysail can be used to modify a ship's sail plan to be more efficient in different types of weather. For example, in high winds a captain might reef a headsail, but that impacts the sail shape as well as the center of effort and can result in slower ship speed, greater heel and increased lee helm. Instead, the headsail could be furled entirely and a staysail used, resulting in higher ship speed due to a lower, further aft center of effort creating less heel and a more balanced sail plan.

== See also ==
- Glossary of nautical terms (A-L)
- Glossary of nautical terms (M-Z)
