= Schooner =

Sailing vessel

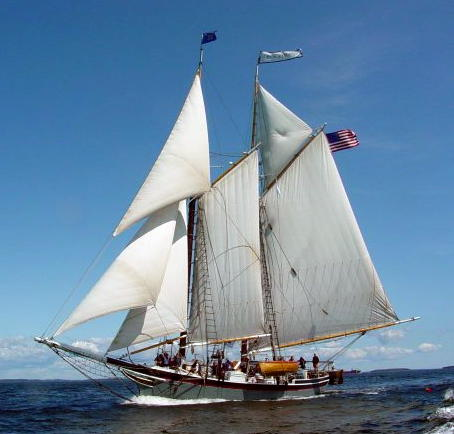
Lewis R. French, a gaff-rigged schooner

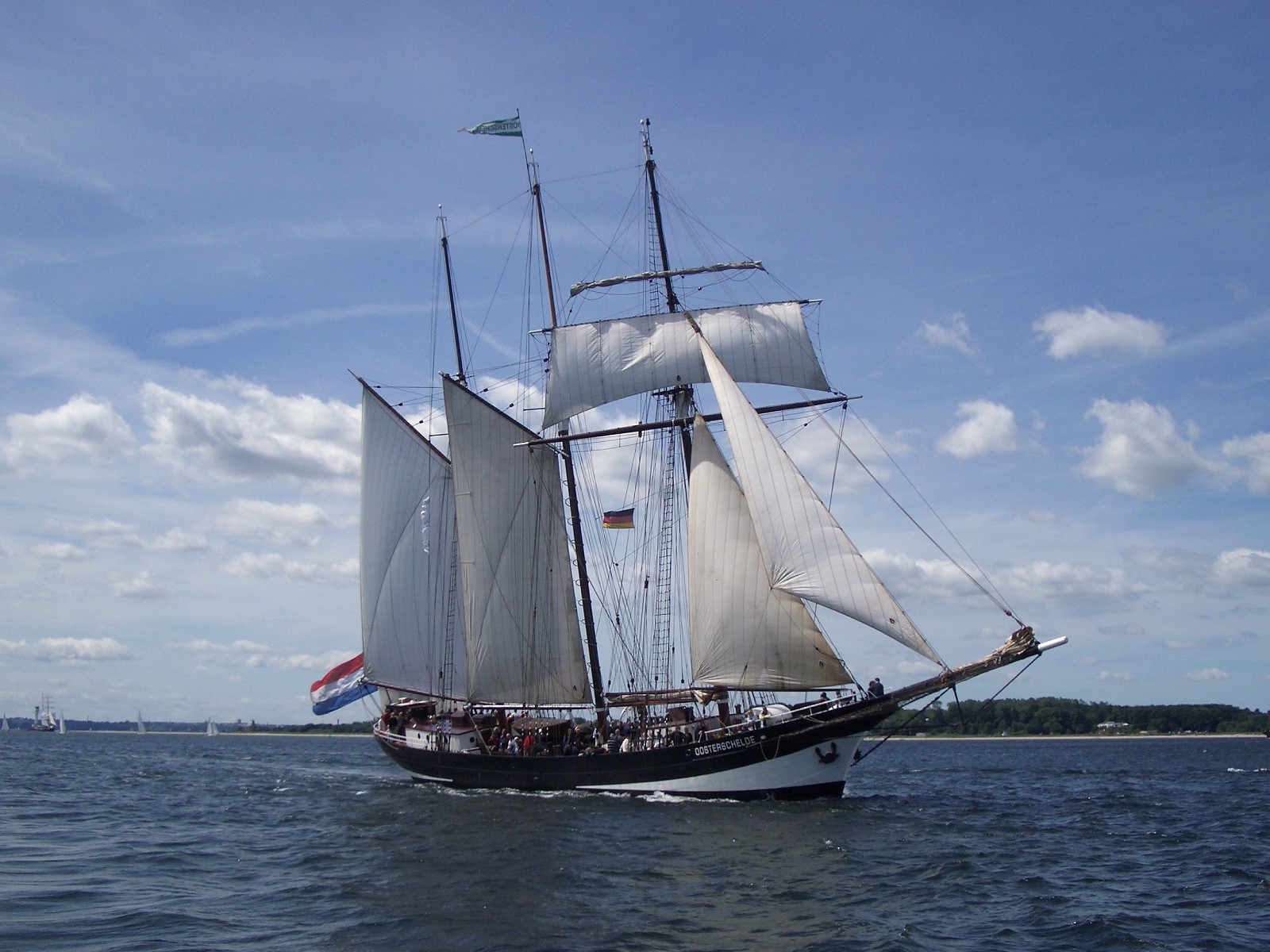
Oosterschelde, a topsail schooner

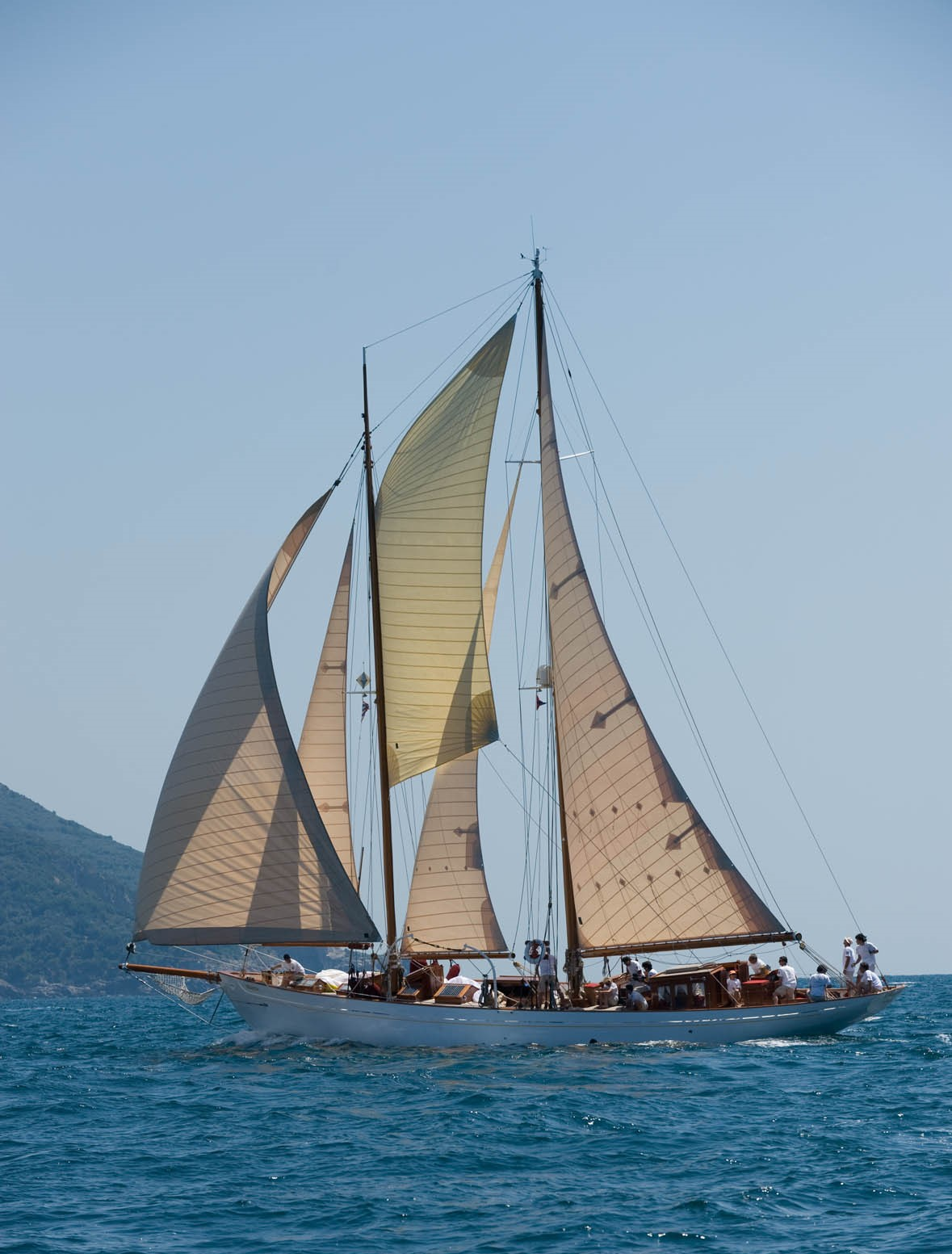
Orianda, a staysail schooner, with Bermuda mainsail

A schooner (/ˈskuːnər/ SKOO-nər) is a type of sailing vessel defined by its fore-and-aft rig on all of two or more masts and the foremast generally being shorter than the mainmast. The most common variants are gaff-rigged and staysail schooners, with the topsail schooner carrying a square topsail on the foremast, and Bermuda and junk-rigs being rarities.

== Name ==
The term "schooner" first appeared in eastern North America in the early 1700s. The term may be related to a Scots word meaning to skip over water, or to skip stones.

== History ==
The exact origins of schooner rigged vessels are obscure, but by the early 17th century they appear in paintings by Dutch marine artists. The earliest known illustration of a schooner depicts a yacht owned by the mayors (Dutch: burgemeesters) of Amsterdam, drawn by the Dutch artist Rool in 1600. Later examples show schooners in Amsterdam in 1638 and New Amsterdam in 1627. Paintings by Van de Velde (1633–1707) and an engraving by Jan Kip of the Thames at Lambeth, dated 1697, suggest that schooner rig was common in England and Holland by the end of the 17th century. The Royal Transport was an example of a large British-built schooner, launched in 1695 at Chatham.

The type was further developed in British North America starting around 1713. In the 1700s and 1800s in what is now New England and Atlantic Canada schooners became popular for coastal trade, and being fast and versatile. Three-masted schooners were introduced around 1800.

The schooner rig was used in vessels for a wide range of purposes. Its good ability to windward was valuable to privateers, pirates, blockade runners, slave ships, smaller naval craft, pilot boats, and opium clippers. Packet boats (built for the fast conveyance of passengers and goods) were often schooners. Fruit schooners were noted for their quick passages, taking their perishable cargoes on routes such as the Azores to Britain. Some very large schooners with five or more masts were built in the United States from circa 1880–1920 for the bulk cargo trade, such as coal and timber. In yachting, schooners predominated in the early years of the America's Cup. In more recent times, schooners have been used as sail training ships.

The fishing vessels that worked the Grand Banks of Newfoundland were schooners, and held in high regard as an outstanding development of the type. This part of North American eastern seaboard is where the term "schooner" first began to be used as a classification for a particular type of vessel. In merchant use, the ease of handling in confined waters and smaller crews relative to square rigged vessels contributed to the schooner's popularity, especially in the 19th century. Some schooners worked on deep sea routes. In British home waters, schooners usually had cargo-carrying hulls that were designed to take the ground in drying harbors (or, even, to unload dried out on an open beach). The last of these once-common craft had ceased trading by the middle of the 20th century.

Schooners were popular on both sides of the Atlantic in the late 1800s and early 1900s. By 1910, 45 five-masted and 10 six-masted bulk-cargo schooners had been built in Bath, Maine, and in towns on Penobscot Bay, including the Wyoming, which is considered the largest wooden ship ever built. The Thomas W. Lawson was the only seven-masted schooner built.

== Rig types ==
The rig is rarely found on a hull of less than 50 feet LOA, and small schooners are generally two-masted. In the two decades around 1900, larger multi-masted schooners were built in New England and on the Great Lakes with four, five, six, or even seven masts. Schooners were traditionally gaff-rigged, and some schooners sailing today are reproductions of famous schooners of old, but modern vessels tend to be Bermuda rigged (or occasionally junk-rigged). While a sloop rig is simpler and cheaper, the schooner rig may be chosen on a larger boat to reduce the overall mast height and keep each sail smaller, and thus easier to handle and reef. Two-masted schooners display a variety of sails filling the gaps between them, such as a gaff sail on the foremast (even with a Bermuda mainsail), or a main staysail, often with a fisherman staysail to fill the gap at the top in light airs.

Schooner types are defined by their rig configuration. Most have a bowsprit although some were built without one for crew safety, such as Adventure.

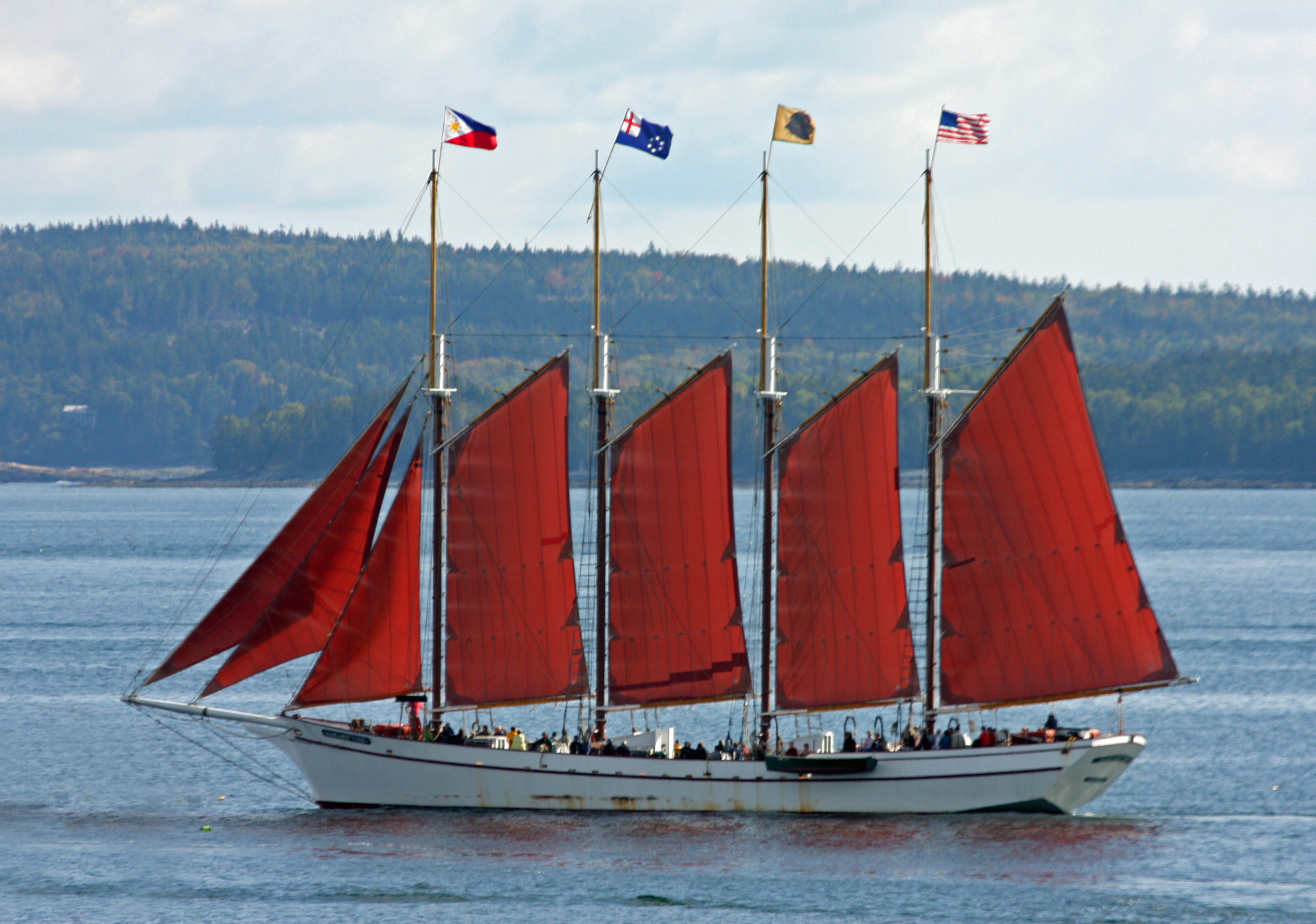
Four-masted schooner, Margaret Todd

Some specific types of schooner include:

- Grand Banks fishing schooner: includes a gaff topsail on the main mast and a fisherman's staysail; in winter topmasts and their upper sails are taken down. Bluenose was one such example.
- Topsail schooner/Square topsail schooner: includes a square topsail on the foremast, to which may be added a topgallant. Differing definitions leave uncertain whether the addition of a fore course would make such a vessel a brigantine. A version with raked masts and known for its great speed, called the Baltimore Clipper was popular in the early 1800s.
- Four- to seven-masted schooners: these designs spread the sail area over many smaller sails, at a time when sails were hoisted by hand, though mechanical assistance was used as the ships, sails, and gaffs became too large and heavy to raise manually. These were used for coastal trade on the Atlantic coast of North America, the West Indies, South America, and some trans-Atlantic voyages.
- Tern schooner: a type of three-masted schooner that was common between 1880 and 1920. These had three masts of equal height and no square sails. The name signifies "three of a kind". The simple rig was driven by the need to keep crew sizes to a minimum. They had a range of hull types, with centre-boards being common, especially in those with shallow draft. Wawona, the largest of this type built, sailed on the West Coast of the United States from 1897 to 1947.

== Uses ==
Fishing schooners Bluenose and Gertrude L. in a race

Schooners were built primarily for cargo, passengers, and fishing.

The Norwegian polar schooner Fram was used by both Fridtjof Nansen and Roald Amundsen in their explorations of the poles.

America, namesake of the America's Cup, was one of the few schooners ever designed for racing. This race was long dominated by schooners. Three-masted schooner Atlantic set the transatlantic sailing record for a monohull in the 1905 Kaiser's Cup race. The record remained unbroken for nearly 100 years. Bluenose (1921–1946) was both a successful fishing boat and a racer.

== See also ==
- List of schooners
