= List of people with surname Warburton =

This is a list of people with surname Warburton.

== A ==
- Adrian Warburton (1918–1944), English RAF Wing Commander
- Albert Warburton (1856–1925), English soccer player
- Alexander Warburton (1852–1929), Canadian politician
- Dame Anne Warburton (1927–2015), British diplomat, the first female British ambassador
- Arthur Warburton (1903–1978), English soccer player

== B ==
- Barclay Harding Warburton I (1866–1954), American newspaper publisher
- Barclay Harding Warburton II (1898–1936), American socialite
- Barclay H. Warburton III (1922–1983), founder of the American Sail Training Association
- Ben Warburton (1864–1943), English soccer player
- Bernard Warburton-Lee (1895–1940), Welsh recipient of the Victoria Cross and the Norwegian War Cross

== C ==
- Callum Warburton (born 1989), English soccer player
- Cecil Warburton (1854–1958), English acarologist
- Charles E. Warburton (1837–1896), American publisher
- Charles Warburton (1754–1826), Irish Anglican bishop
- Charlotte Eliot Warburton (1883–1961), New Zealand community leader
- Choppy Warburton (James Edward Warburton) (1845–1897), English athlete and cycling coach
- Chris Warburton (born 1976), English radio and podcast presenter
- Clark Warburton (1896–1979), American monetary economist
- Cotton Warburton (1911–1982), American football player
- Curt Warburton (born 1981), English martial artist

== D ==
- David Warburton (1965–2025), British politician
- Diana Egerton-Warburton (born 1965), Australian physician

== E ==
- Edward Warburton Jones (1912–1993), Northern Irish barrister, judge and politician
- Elizabeth Barbara Warburton-Lytton (1773–1843), member of the Lytton family of Knebworth House
- Elliot Warburton (1810–1852), Irish traveller and writer, whose brother, George Drought Warburton (1816–1857), shared his interests.
- Ernest Warburton (musicologist) (1937–2001), English musicologist
- Ernest K. Warburton (physicist) (1926–1994), American nuclear physicist
- Ernest K. Warburton (US Air Force) U.S. Air Force Brigadier General and test pilot

== F ==
- Fred Warburton (1880–1948), English football player

== G ==
- Gareth Warburton (born 1982), Welsh middle-distance runner
- Gary Warburton (born 1987), Australian rugby footballer
- George Warburton (footballer born 1915) (1915–1996), English professional footballer
- George Warburton (footballer born 1934), Welsh professional footballer
- George Warburton (priest) (fl. 1631–1641), British Dean of Wells
- Gerome Warburton (born 1995), Welsh boxer

== H ==
- Harry Warburton (1921–2005), Swiss bobsledder
- Helen Warburton, British actress who originally played Vicky McDonald in Coronation Street
- Henry Warburton (1784–1858), English merchant and politician
- Henry Hulme Warburton (1819–1903), English-born American physician, surgeon, and early settler in California
- Herbert B. Warburton (1916–1983), American lawyer and politician

== J ==
- James Warburton (1855–1928), Canadian physician and politician
- James Warburton (Australian businessman) (1970), Australian businessman and media executive
- Joan Warburton (1920–1996), British artist.
- John Warburton, founding member of The Unbroadcastable Radio Show
- John Warburton (actor) (1899 or 1903–1981), British-American actor
- John Warburton (Baptist) (19th century), leader in the Strict Baptist movement
- John Warburton (officer of arms) (1682–1759), antiquarian, cartographer, and collector of old manuscripts
- John Warburton (producer) (born 1964), British television producer and director

== K ==
- Keith Warburton (1929–2018), Australian rules footballer

== L ==
- Lee Warburton (born 1971), British actor
- Leland S. Warburton (1901–1977), American politician
- Lucy Warburton (disambiguation)

== M ==
- Mabel Clarisse Warburton (1879–1961), English Christian missionary and educationalist
- Matt Warburton (born 1978), American television writer
- Morgan Warburton (born 1987), American basketball player

== N ==
- Nev Warburton (1932–2018), Australian politician
- Nick Warburton (born 1947), British writer
- Nigel Warburton (born 1962), British philosopher, lecturer at the Open University

== P ==
- Patrick Warburton (born 1964), American actor
- Peter Egerton-Warburton (1813–1889), explorer of Australia; brother of Rowland Egerton-Warburton
- Peter Warburton (footballer) (born 1951), Australian rules footballer
- Peter Warburton (judge) (c.1540–1621), English judge
- Piers Egerton-Warburton (1839–1914), English politician

== R ==
- Ralph Warburton (1924–2021), American ice hockey player
- Ray Warburton (born 1967), English soccer player
- Richard Warburton (died 1610), English politician
- Sir Robert Warburton (1842–1899), Anglo-Indian soldier and administrator
- Rowland Egerton-Warburton (1804–1891), English landowner and benefactor; brother of Peter Warburton

== S ==
- Sam Warburton (born 1988), Welsh rugby union player
- Stanton Warburton (1865–1926), American politician

== T ==
- Talon Warburton (born 1992), American actor
- Thomas Warburton (1918–2016), Finnish writer
- Thomas Warburton (born 1968), also "Mr. Warburton", American animator and producer
- Tony Warburton, member of English thrash/death metal band Cerebral Fix

== W ==
- Wendy Warburton (born 1976), American politician
- William Warburton (1698–1779), English Anglican bishop and Shakespearean critic
- William Warburton (Dean of Elphin) (1806–1900), Irish Anglican priest
- William T. Warburton (1852–1922), American politician and lawyer

Also

- Warburton baronets of Arley, Cheshire
- Warburton family of Philadelphia
