= Barclay Harding Warburton =

Barclay Harding Warburton may refer to:

- Barclay Harding Warburton I (1866–1954), American publisher
- Barclay Harding Warburton II (1898–1936), American socialite, farmer, and aviator
- Barclay Harding Warburton III (1922–1983), founder of the American Sail Training Association
- Barclay Harding Warburton IV, son of Barclay Harding Warburton III, founder of West Indies Management Company
