= Warburton family =

American family

The Warburton family is a prominent American family which originated in the Philadelphia area.

== Charles Edward Warburton ==
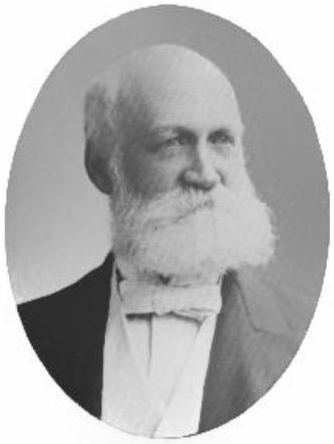
Charles Edward Warburton, from Men of the Century: An Historical Work, published in 1896.

Charles Edward Warburton (March 2, 1837 − September 1, 1896) was the publisher of the Philadelphia Evening Telegraph with James Barclay Harding.

He was born on March 2, 1837, in Philadelphia. He started the Philadelphia Evening Telegraph in 1864.

He died on September 1, 1896, in Atlantic City, New Jersey. At his death his son, Barclay Harding Warburton I took over as publisher.

== Barclay Harding Warburton I ==
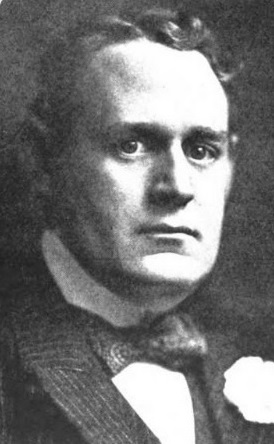
Barclay H. Warburton, pictured in 1912's The History of Battery A (formerly Known as the Keystone Battery): And Troop A, N.G.P.

Major Barclay Harding Warburton I (April 1, 1866 − December 5, 1954) was the publisher of the Philadelphia Evening Telegraph.

He was born on April 1, 1866, in Philadelphia to Charles Edward Warburton. At the death of his father he became the publisher of the Philadelphia Evening Telegraph.

On June 13, 1895, he married Mary Brown Wanamaker. During the Spanish–American War he commanded Light Battery A of the Pennsylvania Artillery during the Puerto Rico Campaign. He was charge d'affairs for President Wilson in London in 1914–1917, becoming one of General Pershing's aides-de-camp in Paris in 1917.

His son Barclay H Warburton II was the first American to serve at the Ecole Militaire Saint Cyr during this same time, while both were serving in Paris at the same time; he is known to have remarked to his father, Major Warburton, "You've got to get me out of here; we are still training on horses, and you know I want to fly." (Which he then did so do)

In 1921 he was named as the Special Police Commissioner for Philadelphia by Joseph Hampton Moore. He was elected Mayor of Palm Beach, Florida in 1928, and resigned in 1929 to return to manage EF Hutton office in Philadelphia.

He died on December 5, 1954.

== Barclay Harding Warburton II ==
Barclay Harding Warburton II (June 15, 1898 − November 26, 1936) was an American socialite, farmer, aviator and member of the Hoover Commission in Poland. He was also an assistant director at 20th Century Fox.

He was born on June 15, 1898, in Philadelphia to Barclay Harding Warburton I and Mary Brown Wanamaker. He married Rosamond Lancaster on December 10, 1919, in Elkton, Maryland, and they had a daughter Rosemary Warburton, born in 1921, and a son, Barclay Harding Warburton III, born in 1922. After a divorce in 1926 she married William Kissam Vanderbilt II. In 1922 he received his Royal Aero Club certificate from the Grahame-White school of flying. In 1930 he announced plans to fly solo around the world. In 1931 he married Evelyn Hall Pierce after she obtained a divorce in Reno, Nevada. She was the daughter of Charles E. McMafus of Rye, New York.

On June 27, 1936, he set off a firework at a party for Harold Ross that exploded in his face.

He died after a hunting accident on November 26, 1936, in Abington Memorial Hospital. He said that his shotgun had accidentally fired while he was climbing a fence while hunting for pheasant at his Saracen Farm near in Doylestown, Pennsylvania. He survived long enough to make it back to the house, only to die on the front door steps.

== Barclay Harding Warburton III ==
Barclay Harding Warburton III (February 5, 1922 − May 1, 1983) (Buzz, Buzzy, Buzzie to his close friends Barclay to the rest) was founder of the American Sail Training Association.

He was born on February 5, 1922, to Barclay Harding Warburton II and Rosamund Lancaster. Warburton was a step-son of William Kissam Vanderbilt II and a step-nephew of Harold Stirling Vanderbilt when Rosamund remarried.

In 1936 his father died in a hunting accident. Barclay graduated from Harvard University in 1948, served in the Massachusetts House of Representatives as a representative from the 2nd Essex district. He was a member of the Agriculture committee and the Marine Fisheries Committee.

He married Margrett Mckean of Prides Crossing, Massachusetts, in 1947. They then purchased the 140-acre Mosley place and renamed it Saracen Farm in Ipswich, Massachusetts, turning it in to an organic dairy farm milking 50 head of Golden Guernseys. In 1959, Buzz and Margie divorced and the farm was sold to the Catholic Church. Buzzie purchased the 72 ft brigantine Black Pearl and set off around the world after some repairs in Florida. Having gotten as halfway to Panama, better senses got hold of him and he returned to the Bahamas, where he settled in at Lyford Cay and built several houses during his years there over by Clifton Dock.

In 1964, he participated in the OPSAIL 64 and his purpose was complete. Sail training was for him. From then on the Black Pearl was no longer the yacht Black Pearl, but rather the sail training ship Black Pearl.

When the Bahamas gained independence, Buzz established the Black Pearl restaurant in Newport. While the restaurant was not a financial success for Buzz, it became a venue for folk and bluegrass musicians on weekends. The restaurant remains an established fixture in the Newport area.

By 1972, Warburton had readied the boat for a transatlantic passage, starting with a shakedown cruise to the Virgin Islands. In late May the Black Pearl left for England with 14 crew and after 23 days arrived at the Lizards. Traveling through Europe that summer with tall ships earned him much praise and recognition, and by the end of the summer The Brits (STA) asked him to start an American STA and become its chairman, which he did.

The '76 Tall Ships was a great success and really put Newport on the map. Warburton sold the Black Pearl Restaurant to Tom Cullen but kept a royalty for the use of the name. However, he is most known for founding the American Sail Training Association which was inspired by his many travels under the power of wind to Europe and elsewhere. He died on May 1, 1983, leaving behind five children in addition to other family members, friends, employees and other associates.

== Barclay Harding Warburton IV ==
Barclay Harding Warburton IV (Tim), the son of Barclay Harding Warburton III, Warburton attended Le Rosey School, St Andrews School, Hyde School, and Boston University. He served with the US Merchant Marine (2 Pacific crossings 1968) during the Vietnam War, and then served in the United States Navy (1968–1970) as navigator.

He was founder of the Connecticut River Valley Boatworks in 1972, which became the Vermont Oak Company in 1976 specializing in high-quality oak, walnut, and cherry furniture. In 1984 he joined with Brook Phillips Lacour to pioneer the villa vacation model as an alternative to staying in hotels beginning in St. Barthelemy as an owner of West Indies Management Company (WIMCO Villas and Hotels), headquartered in Newport, with the purpose of renting vacation homes in prime locations while not occupied by their owners. This proved successful, and the company quickly moved on to St Martin, Anguilla, Nevis, Barbados, Mustique, and then into the South of France, Italy and Greece, as well as Nantucket, Hawaii, and Mexico.

Warburton's love of sailing brought him across the Atlantic twice, once as sailing master in 1972, and returning in 1973 as skipper aboard the 72 ft brigantine Black Pearl. Warburton sailed with his father regularly, and joined him in Opsail ’64, New York, Tall Ships '72, Cowes, Malmo and Travemünde, and then again in '76 from Newport–Bermuda–New York–Boston. Warburton has raced as navigator aboard the 65 ft yawl "Nirvana", participating in such events as 1986 Statue of Liberty celebrations, 1994 New York Yacht Club Sesquicentennial and the 2001 America's Cup Jubilee in Cowes, winning the Antigua Classic Race Week in 2005. Warburton has served as a director of the Newport Music Festival, and the American Sail Training Association (Tall Ships).

Married Julie Phillips of Southport, Connecticut, 1986. Has two children: Lila Mckean Warburton (born 1987) and Heather Phillips Warburton (born 1989).
