= George Warburton =

George Warburton may refer to:

- George Warburton (footballer, born 1915) (1915–1996), English professional footballer
- George Warburton (footballer, born 1934), Welsh professional footballer
- George Warburton (priest) (1580–1641), English Dean of Wells
- George Drought Warburton, Member of the UK Parliament for Harwich
- Sir George Warburton, 3rd Baronet (1675–1743), British Member of Parliament for Cheshire
- George Warburton (died 1709), Member of the Parliament of Ireland for Gowran and Portarlington
- George Warburton (1713–1753), Member of the Parliament of Ireland for County Galway
- Sir George Warburton, 1st Baronet (1622–1676) of the Warburton baronets

== See also ==
- Warburton (disambiguation)
