= Ernest Warburton =

Ernest Warburton may refer to:

- Ernest Warburton (musicologist)
- Ernest K. Warburton (physicist)
- Ernest K. Warburton (US Air Force)
