= Beatrice Corliss =

American politician

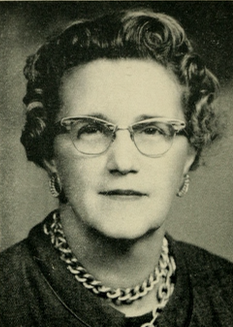
- Corliss's official portrait, 1961

Member of the Massachusetts House of Representatives from the 2nd Essex district
- In office 1961–1964
- Preceded by: Barclay H. Warburton III
- Succeeded by: Seat eliminated

Mayor of Gloucester, Massachusetts
- In office 1955–1959
- Preceded by: Benjamin A. Smith II
- Succeeded by: J. Stanley Boudreau

Personal details
- Born: October 21, 1910 Gloucester, Massachusetts, US
- Died: January 12, 1995 (aged 84) Northfield, Vermont, US
- Resting place: Wesleyan Cemetery, Gloucester, Massachusetts
- Party: Republican
- Spouse: William Kirkland Corliss
- Children: 3
- Education: Simmons College
- Occupation: Accountant; Politician

Beatrice Keene (Webber) Corliss (October 21, 1910 – January 12, 1995) was an American politician who served as the first female Mayor of Gloucester, Massachusetts.

== Early life and business career ==
Corliss was born on October 21, 1910, in Gloucester. She graduated from Simmons College. Professionally, she worked as an accountant for Birds Eye before becoming the assistant treasurer of Consolidated Lobster. She also aided her husband's business by picking strawberries and raspberries.

== Political career ==
Corliss political involvement began as a member of the Federation of Business and Professional Women's Clubs of Gloucester, an organization whose activities included supporting candidates for appointed office.

In 1951, Corliss attempted her first run for office as a candidate for Gloucester school committee. She was successful and was reelected in 1953. In 1955, she was the highest vote-getter in the city council election and was elected mayor by her fellow councilors; at the time, Gloucester employed a "weak mayor" form of government, and full time administration of the city departments was in the hands of an appointed city manager. She was reelected to the city council in 1957 and was once again chosen to serve as Mayor.

In 1960, Corliss was a candidate for the Massachusetts House of Representatives in the 2nd Essex District after incumbent Barclay H. Warburton III chose to retire. As the district only included three wards in Gloucester, she had to branch out and campaign in the district's other municipalities (Amesbury Essex, Georgetown, Ipswich, Newbury, Rowley, and West Newbury). She defeated six male candidates to win the Republican nomination. During her tenure in the House, Corliss served on the Ways and Means, Towns, and Harbors and Public Lands committees.

Corliss was also a delegate to the 1960 Republican National Convention.

From 1964 to 1969, she served as the appointments secretary for Massachusetts Governor John A. Volpe.

== Later life and death ==
Corliss and her husband later moved to Northfield, Vermont. She died on January 12, 1995, in Northfield.
