= U.S. Air Force Test Pilot School =

US Air Force's advanced flight training school

Coordinates: 34.9171°N 117.9000°W

USAF Test Pilot School
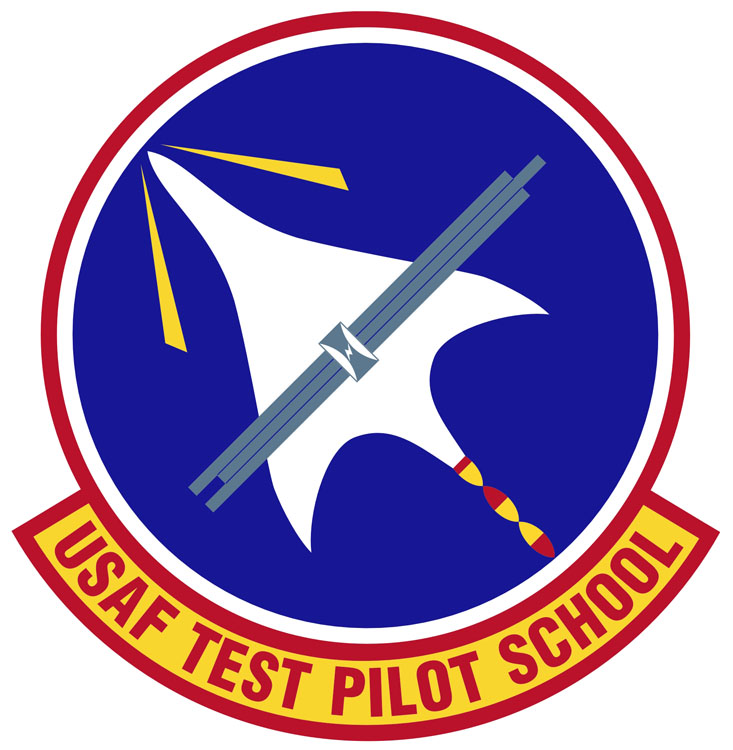
- Active: 9 September 1944-Present
- Country: United States
- Branch: United States Air Force
- Type: Test Pilot School
- Size: 150
- Part of: 412th Test Wing
- Garrison/HQ: Edwards Air Force Base
- Nickname: USAFTPS
- Motto: Scientia est Virtus

Commanders
- Current commander: Col Maryann L. Karlen
- Notable commanders: Chuck Yeager; Buzz Aldrin

Insignia
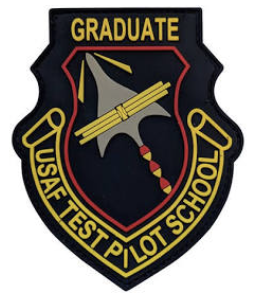
- U.S. Air Force Test Pilot School Graduate Patch

The U.S. Air Force Test Pilot School (USAF TPS) is the United States Air Force's advanced flight training school that trains experimental test pilots, flight test engineers, and flight test navigators to carry out tests and evaluations of new aerospace weapon systems and also other aircraft. This school was established on 9 September 1944 as the Flight Test Training Unit at Wright-Patterson Air Force Base (AFB) in Dayton, Ohio. On 4 February 1951, the school was moved to Edwards Air Force Base in the Mojave Desert of Southern California, which offered uncongested skies, usually superb flying weather, and a lower risk that a crash would threaten people or buildings.

The TPS was created to formalize and standardize test pilot training, reduce the high accident rate during the 1940s, and increase the number of productive test flights. In response to the increasing complexity of aircraft and their electronic systems, the school added training programs for flight test engineers and flight test navigators. Between 1962 and 1972, the test pilot school included astronaut training for armed forces test pilots, but these classes were dropped when the U.S. Air Force crewed spaceflight program was suspended. Class sizes have been uniformly quite small, with recent classes having about twenty students. The school is a component of the 412th Test Wing of the Air Force Materiel Command.

== Mission ==
The USAF TPS aims to produce "highly adaptive, critical-thinking flight test professionals to lead and conduct full-spectrum tests and evaluations of aerospace weapons, and to be the world's premier educational and training center for theoretical and applied flight test engineering".

== Selection process ==
The school graduates two classes per year.

- Admission into the USAF TPS is extremely competitive. Thousands of pilots apply. Some are placed on a waitlist two or three times before being accepted.
- Civilians may apply for the long-course program.
- Prospective students fill out a general TPS application plus forms for USAF pilots and navigators, experimental engineers, and civilian applicants.
- Engineer and civilian applicants must pass a flying Class III physical before facing the TPS selection board.
- Applications must be received by Special Flying Programs Section HQ AFPC/DPAOT3 no later than 45 days before the selection boards meet. The boards are held once a year at the headquarters of the Air Force Personnel Center, normally in November, to pick the members of the school's two classes of the next year, including AFIT-TPS students and students from foreign TPS schools. The board is chaired by the TPS commandant; other members are appointed by the AFMC/DO and include an HQ AFPC colonel. Most of the board members must be TPS graduates (majors or lieutenant colonels) who lead flight test squadrons.

=== Admission requirements ===
All candidates require secret clearance. As of May 2015, the minimum admission requirements for application to the USAF TPS are:

| Course | Time in Service (at time of entry) | Education | Experience | Physical qualification |
|---|---|---|---|---|
| Experimental test pilot | Less than 9 years and 6 months (helicopter: 10 years and 3 months) | Bachelor of Science (BS) in engineering, math, or physics (GPA > 3.0) | 12 months Aircraft Commander (AC) in a major weapon system (MWS); 750 hours or instructor pilot (IP) in an MWS (1,000 hours if dual IP); Note: 250 hours of manned non-MWS time may be included | Annual flying class II |
| Experimental test RPA (Remotely Piloted Aircraft) pilot | Less than 9 years and 6 months | Bachelor of Science (BS) in engineering, math, or physics (GPA > 3.0) | IP in RPA MWS or at least 750 hours Note: 250 hours in a manned MWS may be included | Annual flying class II |
| Experimental combat systems officer (CSO including navigator, WSO) | Less than 9 years and 6 months | Bachelor of Science (BS) in engineering, math, or physics (GPA > 3.0) | Instructor in CSO MWS or at least 500 hours in MWS, excludes student time | Annual flying class II |
| Experimental flight test engineer | Less than 8 years | BS in engineering, math, or physics (GPA > 3.0); A technical M.S. degree highly desired | ≥ 2 years experience in 13XX, 14NX, 15AX, 17XX 21AX, 21CX, 21LX, 21MX, 33SX, 61X, 62EX, 63AX | Annual flying class III |

- Grade point average is on a 4.0 scale.
- Air Force standards for flying duty are defined in Air Force Instruction 48-123, Chapter 6.
- Air Force Specialty Codes listed for engineers include:
  - 13XX—Operations: Space, Missile, Command, and Control
  - 14NX—Operations: Intelligence
  - 21AX—Logistics: Aircraft Maintenance
  - 21CX—Logistics: (not found)
  - 21LX—Logistics: Logistician
  - 21MX—Logistics: Munitions and Missile Maintenance
  - 33SX—Support: Communications and Information
  - 61SX—Acquisition: Scientist
  - 62EX—Acquisition: Developmental Engineer
  - 63AX—Acquisition: Acquisition Manager

=== Exchange program ===
From time to time, students are selected to attend different test pilot schools in an exchange program between test cultures. Toward this end, students can be sent to the Naval Test Pilot School at Naval Air Station Patuxent River, Maryland, and vice versa. Also, the USAF Test Pilot School has an exchange program with the Empire Test Pilots' School at Boscombe Down, England, and the EPNER (École du Personnel Navigant d'Essais et de Réception), the French Test Pilot's School.

=== Course of study ===
- The USAF TPS curriculum is designed to grant a Master of Science degree in flight test engineering through the Air Force's Air University at the end of the 48-week course. Students are required to take all of the 20 offered courses to graduate. This is a total of 50 credit hours for the 48-week course. Each of the four phases are broken down into three or four main lecture courses, plus their associated flight laboratory work or flight simulator work, and actual practice flights. To graduate from the USAF TPS, a student must be in good standing and satisfactorily complete all academic tests, all oral and written reports, all of the required flight missions, and comprehensive pre-graduation written and oral evaluations with an overall GPA of 3.0 or better.
- Accreditation from the American Council of Education has been in effect since July 1974 (last updated in July 1998) to recommend selected coursework for transfer credit to other higher education institutions.
- At graduation, the commandant usually presents these awards:
  - Liethen-Tittle Award to the experimental test pilot graduate with the best overall record for outstanding performance and academic excellence
  - R.L. Jones Award to the outstanding experimental test navigator or experimental flight test engineer graduate with the best overall record for outstanding performance and academic excellence

== Curriculum ==
- Two classes are held each year, 48 weeks each (long class). Students can apply for one of three tracks - experimental test pilot, flight test engineer, or flight test navigator. The upper class is called the senior class, while the lower class is called the juniors, determined by what point they are at in their studies at TPS. The class size at TPS varies. Over the past few years, over 20 TPS students have been in each class.
- The four main subdisciplines taught by the USAF TPS Education Division are
  - Performance
  - Flying qualities
  - Systems
  - Test management
- TPS also offers short courses in these areas:
  - Aerospace vehicle test course
  - Unmanned aerial vehicle flight test engineering
  - Electronic warfare flight test engineering
  - Test management
  - Equations of motion
  - Propulsion
  - Senior executive course
- Organization of the class uses this chain of command:
  - Commandant—TPS commander
  - Deputy commandant—TPS deputy commander
  - Class leader— assigned by the front office based on seniority and academic curriculum to assist the student population
  - Students
- Facilities include
  - Two fully functional control rooms
  - RADAR and electro-optics labs
  - Variable-stability in-flight simulator test aircraft or F-16 VISTA
  - Student library
  - About 100 airborne laboratories over the course of the academic year from Mikoyan-Gurevich MiG-15 to Northrop Grumman B-2 Spirit

== History ==
=== Early years ===
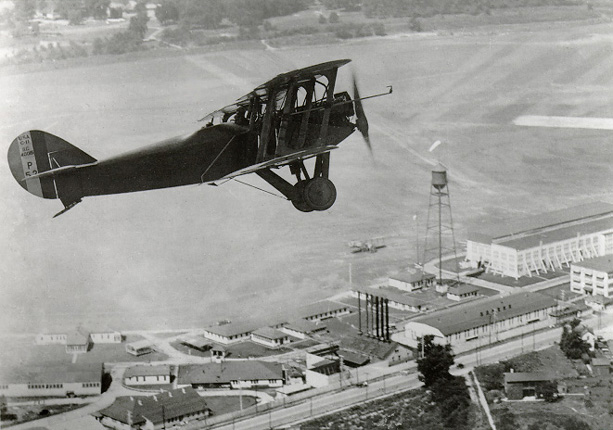
Packard-LePere Lusac 11 Biplane over McCook Field

Although the United States Armed Forces had been evaluating aircraft since Lt. Benny Foulois flew with Orville Wright in 1909, the designation of "test pilot" was not formally applied until a group of McCook Field pilots was assigned to a flight testing squadron at Wright Field during World War I. Test pilot selection was a seemingly indiscriminate process yielding a mix of experienced pilots who had volunteered for the task, flight instructors who were simply assigned to the job, and the occasional officer fresh from flying school. One of the latter, Lt. Donald L. Putt, who would later rise to the rank of lieutenant general, recalled:

...out of the blue, I got orders to report to Dayton...I had not shown any interest in wanting to be a test pilot.

Test pilot training was nearly as informal as the selection process with most material directed toward the aeronautical engineers who supervised the tests. Reports and texts of this time provided little guidance regarding how tests should be flown. The best training for test pilots came from practical experience gained while flying as observers and hangar-talk tutorials from other pilots. A test pilot was not expected to have a formal engineering background. He was simply to follow the instructions on the test card and fly the airplane appropriately. Setting the standard to overcome this condition were test pilots such as Jimmy Doolittle. While at McCook Field, Doolittle served as a test pilot, but was given leave to earn both Master of Science and doctoral degrees from the Massachusetts Institute of Technology. Today, most test pilots have advanced degrees in engineering.

=== At Wright-Patterson AFB ===
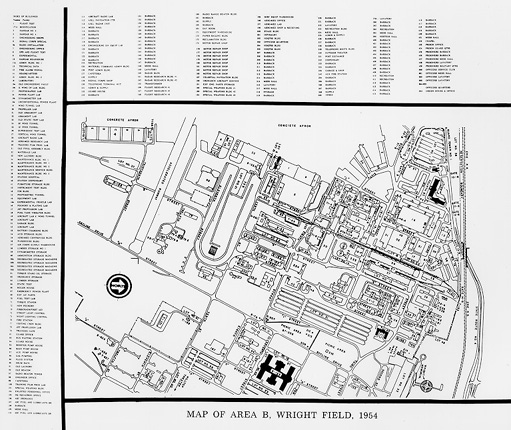
Map of Wright Field in 1954

Inspired by the RAF's Empire Test Pilots' School, Colonel Ernest K. Warburton, chief of the Flight Test Section at Wright Field, set about changing the role and status of flight testing in the Army Air Forces. His goals for the flight test community were standardization and independence, which were later realized with the establishment of the Air Technical Command Flight Test Training unit on 9 September 1944 and the independent Flight Test Division in 1945. The AAF now had a formal program of study to train young pilots to become flight test professionals. Under the command of Major Ralph C. Hoewing, the Flight Test Training Unit's curriculum included classroom sessions covering performance flight test theory and piloting techniques. The students then put theory into practice with performance evaluations on the AT-6 Texan trainer. Shortly after the first class graduated, the school was redesignated the Flight Section School Branch with an increased focus on academic theory. In 1945, the school moved to Vandalia Municipal Airport (now the Dayton International Airport), after which it was redesignated the Flight Performance School and placed under the command of Lt. Colonel John R. Muehlberg, who became the first to carry the title "commandant". Little is known about the second class of students (the first class at Vandalia), but according to Robert "Bob" Rahn in his book Tempting Fate, he identified four pilots who were in this class: Richard Ira Bong, Dominic Salvatore "Don" Gentile, Glen Edwards, and Robert "Bob" Rahn. The class designation for this class is not known. Under Muehlberg, who in 1944/45 had attended the second course at the newly established ETPS in England, the school increased its fleet with North American P-51 Mustangs, Boeing B-17 Flying Fortress, and North American B-25 Mitchells and expanded the curriculum to include a separate four-month stability and control course in addition to the existing performance course. In 1946, the test pilot school was moved again to nearby Patterson Field and Colonel Albert Boyd was assigned as chief of the Flight Test Division. Col. Boyd profoundly influenced both the school and the character of its future AAF test pilots with his insistence on precision flying skills and discipline. A graduate of the school in 1946, Major Bob Cardenas, later summarized Col. Boyd's influence:

The old-fashioned version of the test pilot wrapped up in its hazy aura of glamorous high adventure is gone. No more do they judge a test pilot's flying skill by his ability to tear the wings of the aircraft in a screaming terminal velocity dive. This has been replaced by flying abilities capable of holding very close tolerances to airspeed, altitude, and rate of climb while engaged in reading data, adjusting power, and writing down observations. It is an exact science requiring precision flying of the highest caliber.

=== Heading west ===
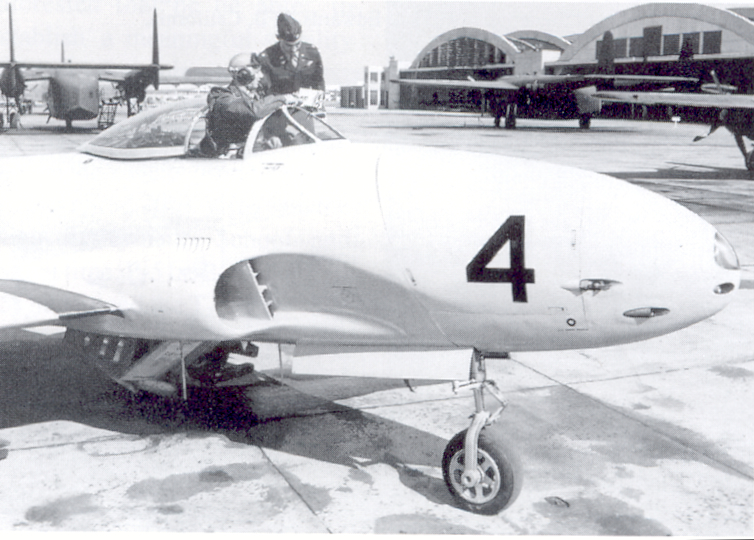
Test Pilot School Lockheed P-80 Shooting Star

Frequent bad weather and increased air traffic congestion at Wright-Patterson often prevented students from completing their coursework on time. In addition, most USAAF airplanes were by then being manufactured and tested by contractors on the West Coast of the United States. For these and other reasons, Col. Boyd began the transfer of all flight test operations, including the test pilot school, to Muroc Army Air Field. next to Rogers Dry Lake in the desert of southern California. The school continued operations at Patterson Field, and 1947, had the first United States Air Force class and the first class to fly jets. The Lockheed P-80 Shooting Star would provide jet performance training at the school until 1954.

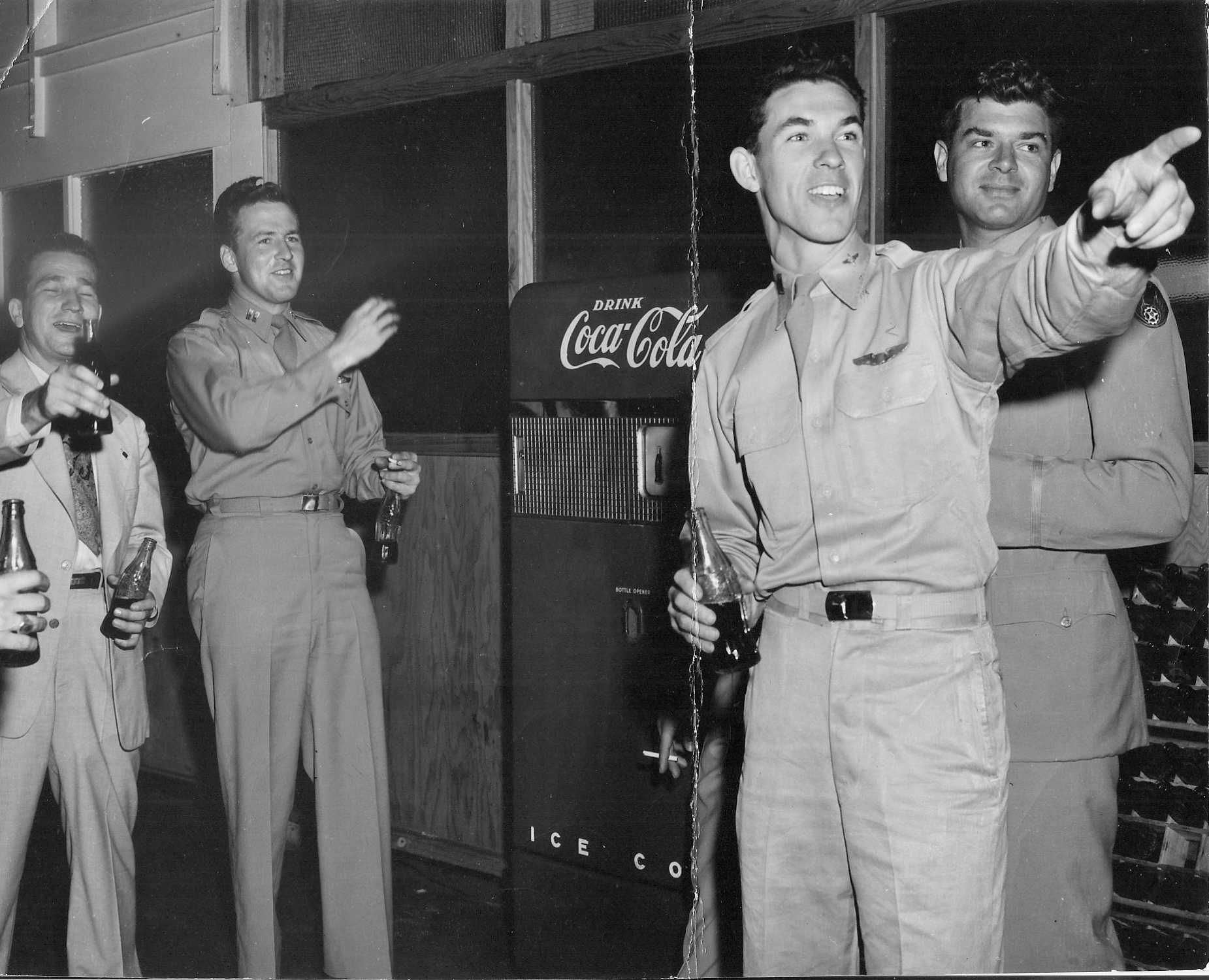
Member of the USAF Test Pilots School class 49C: From Left to right: Joseph John "Tym" Tymczyszyn, 1st Lt. Thomas Blazing, 1st Lt. Richard Dennen, Capt. Harold Killian (circa 1949)

In 1949, this school was renamed the Air Material Command Experimental Test Pilot School, and the soon-to-be Brigadier General Boyd assumed command of Muroc Air Force Base. Boyd chose Major John Amman, an instructor at the school, to go to Muroc AFB, and implement the details of the school's move westward. On 8 December 1949, Muroc AFB has renamed the Edwards Air Force Base in honor of Glen Edwards, TPS class 45, who was killed in the crash of the Northrop YB-49 Flying Wing bomber. Captain Edwards, who had recently earned a Master of Science degree in aeronautical engineering from Princeton, typified the new breed of test pilot of which Cardenas had written — one who combined the talents of a highly skilled pilot with the technical expertise of an engineer. Amman completed his work and on 4 February 1951, the school was officially transferred to Edwards Air Force Base. The enormous dry lake bed, extremely long runways, and clear weather served the USAF and the school well, as aircraft performance continued to increase.

=== Edwards Air Force Base ===
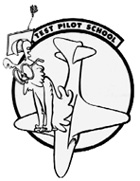
Unofficial "Howland Owl" TPS logo from the early days at EAFB.

The TPS was housed in an old weather-beaten wooden hangar along the flight line of what became known as South Base. Although the quarters were spartan, the weather was superb with only two flying days lost due to weather in the first seven months of operation. Taking advantage of the calm morning air, students started the day flying missions to collect test data. Afternoons were spent in the lecture hall, and evenings were devoted to reducing data from the day's flights. Data reduction was dull and labor-intensive, requiring the student to transcribe information recorded on film or oscillograph paper and perform calculations by hand or slide rule. Once reduced, the data were woven into a report that summarized the test and the student's conclusions. Some students were not prepared for the rigorous academics and had to be dropped from enrollment. This situation improved in 1953, when the school was moved out of Air Research and Development Command, which allowed the selection boards to draw from a much larger, USAF-wide, pool of applicants, rather than just the local test squadrons.

Although changes to the curriculum could be made quickly, the acquisition of aircraft for the school remained a perennial challenge for the school's staff. The Lockheed T-33 Shooting Star arrived in 1953 and became a staple for the students over the next 23 years. More aircraft types were added during the 1950s, including the Republic F-84 Thunderjet, North American F-86 Sabre, North American F-100 Super Sabre, Martin B-57 Canberra, and Convair F-102 Delta Dagger — the school's first delta-winged airplane. In 1955, the school was renamed the U.S. Air Force Flight Test Pilot School, and a year later, moved into its present location on the Main Base facility. This new building, built at a cost of $156,000, was the first and only structure designed specifically for the purposes of the school.

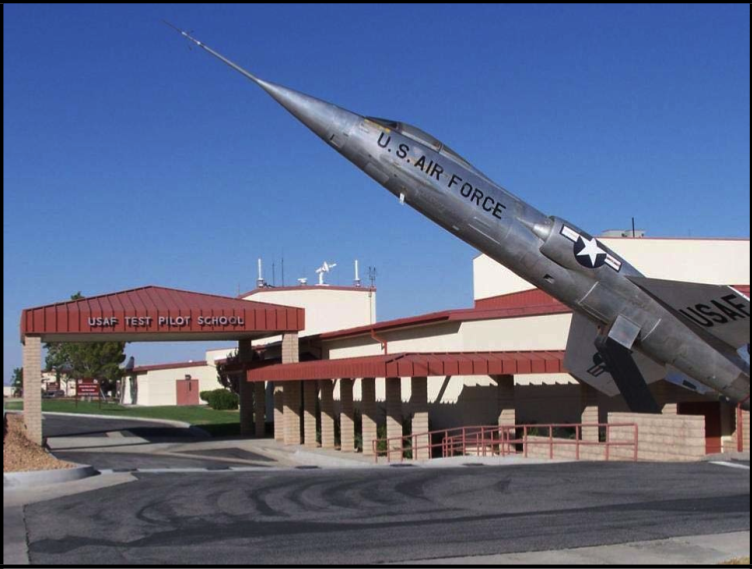
TPS Building, Edwards AFB

In 1956, the school chose an official emblem, featuring a slide rule in front of the silhouette of a climbing jet, and a motto, Scientia est Virtus — Latin for "Knowledge is Power". The new logo emphasized the school's role in preparing students with both the technical theory and flying skills indispensable for evaluating modern aircraft. The new logo also replaced the unofficial badge of Dr. Howland Owl, a character from the popular Pogo comic strip, that appeared on the noses of many of the school's airplanes.

As the Air Force gradually developed an aerospace doctrine during this period, a small cadre began to establish the criteria for additional coursework aimed at qualifying TPS graduates for the tasks of an astronaut. On Oct. 12, 1961, the Test Pilot School has redesignated the U.S. Air Force Aerospace Research Pilot School (ARPS), with the curriculum, expanded to a full year, divided into Phase I (Experimental Test Pilot Course) and Phase II (Aerospace Research Pilot Course).

Between 1962 and 1975, the test pilot school expanded its role to include astronaut training for armed forces test pilots. Thirty-seven TPS graduates were selected for the U.S. space program, and 26 earned astronaut's wings by flying in the X-15, Gemini, Apollo, and Space Shuttle programs.

On 21 May 2009, a T-38 Talon from the test pilot school on a training flight crashed 12 miles north of Edwards AFB, killing the student pilot Major Mark Paul Graziano and severely injuring the student navigator Major Lee Vincent Jones. An accident investigation determined that the crash was caused when the aircraft's rudder operating mechanism disconnected the flight controls from the rudder actuators and caused the rudder to deflect 30° to the left. This induced an uncontrollable yaw and a resulting roll, causing the aircraft to depart a controlled flight, a condition that is unrecoverable in the T-38. The report stated that contributing factors to the crash were a structural fatigue failure or a structural break in a critical component or bolt, and a maintenance error in which a nut or cotter pin did not properly secure a bolt connecting two critical components. Citing two historical cases of rudder failure, the report concluded that maintenance error was the more likely cause. The investigation concluded, "insufficient supervisory oversight and a lack of discipline of the training process" in the maintenance unit existed in relation to the mishap aircraft.

== Personnel ==
=== Commandants ===
The commanding officer of the USAF test pilot school is better known by the title of the commandant. Although not an official prerequisite for the position, most commandants are themselves graduates of the test pilot school. As of September 2023, Colonel James Valpiani is the commandant of the school.

Gallery of USAF TPS Commandants

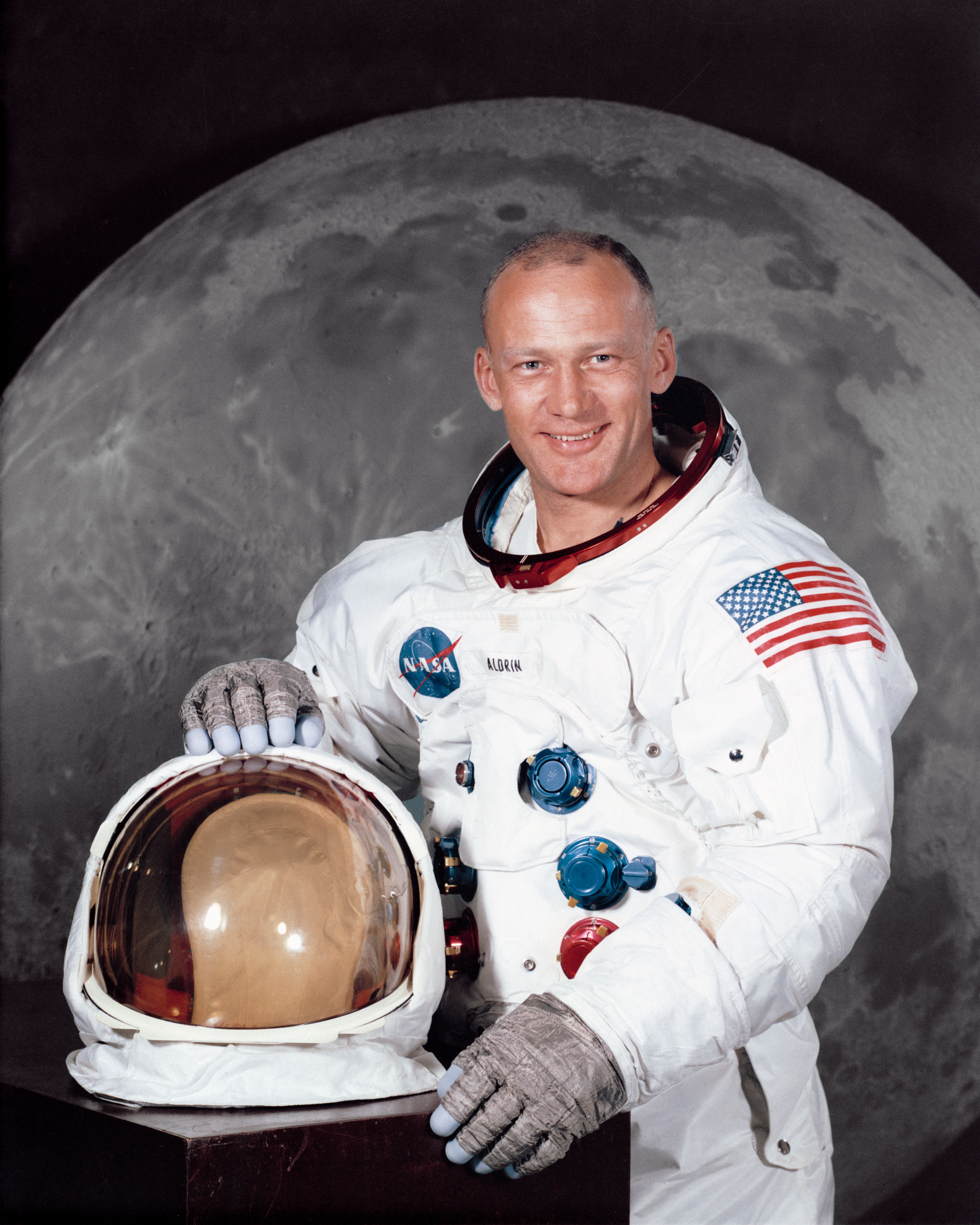
Buzz Aldrin
July 1971 – February 1972

Gene Deatrick
May 1967 – June 1968

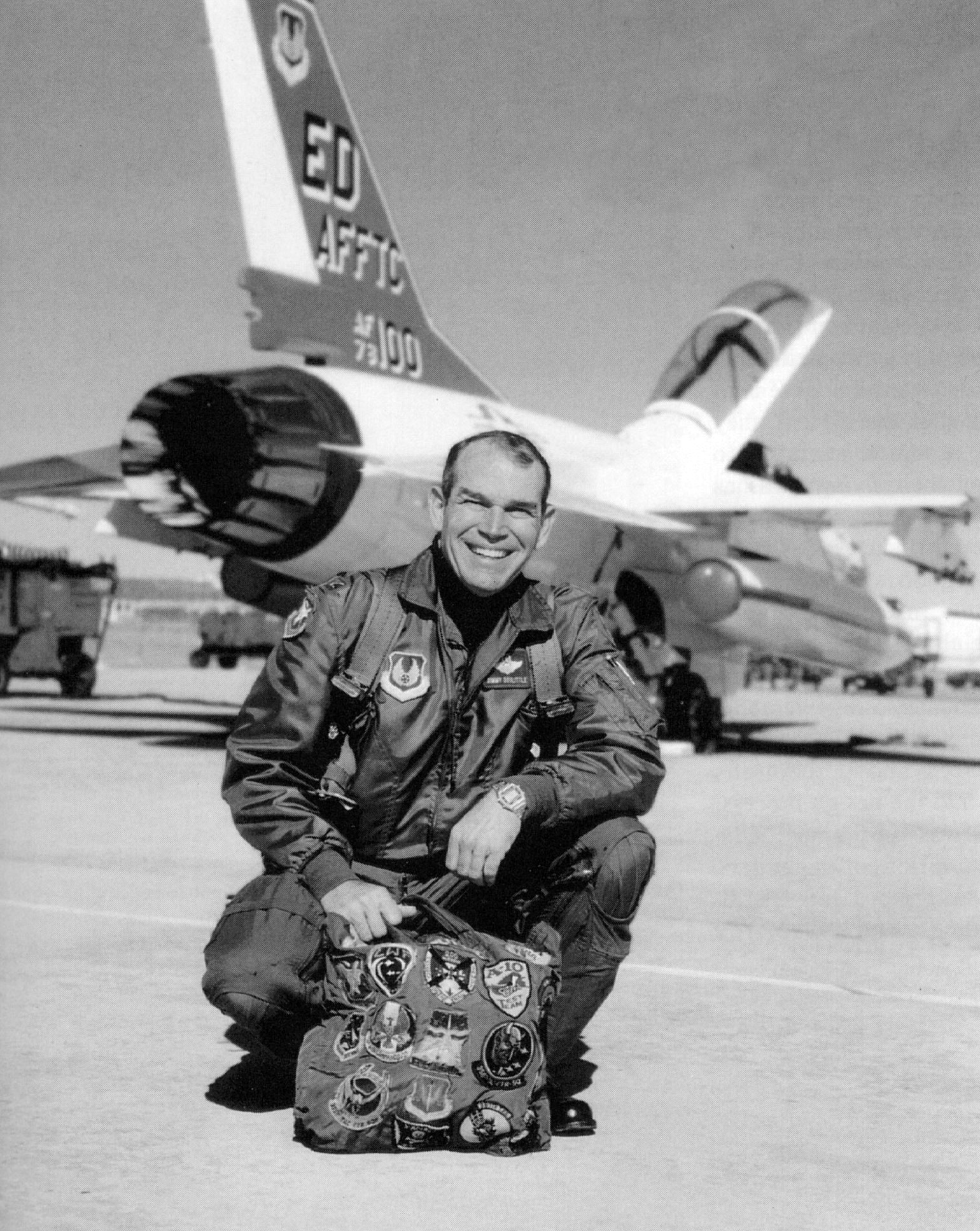
Jim Doolittle, III
April 1994 – August 1996

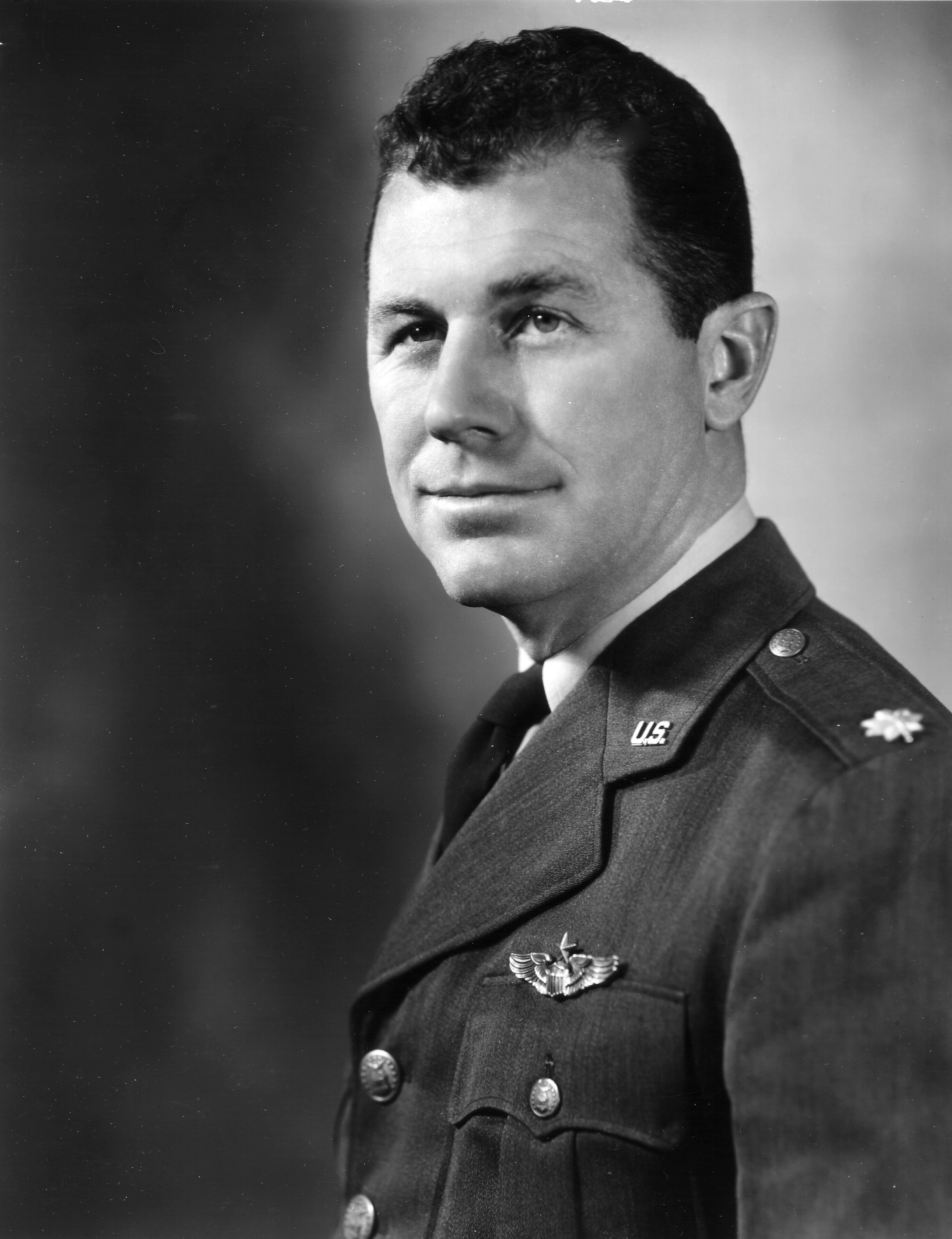
Chuck Yeager
July 1962 – July 1966

=== Notable alumni ===
TPS has produced many notable alumni, including astronauts, record-setting aviators, and senior Air Force leaders.

Gallery of USAF TPS Alumni

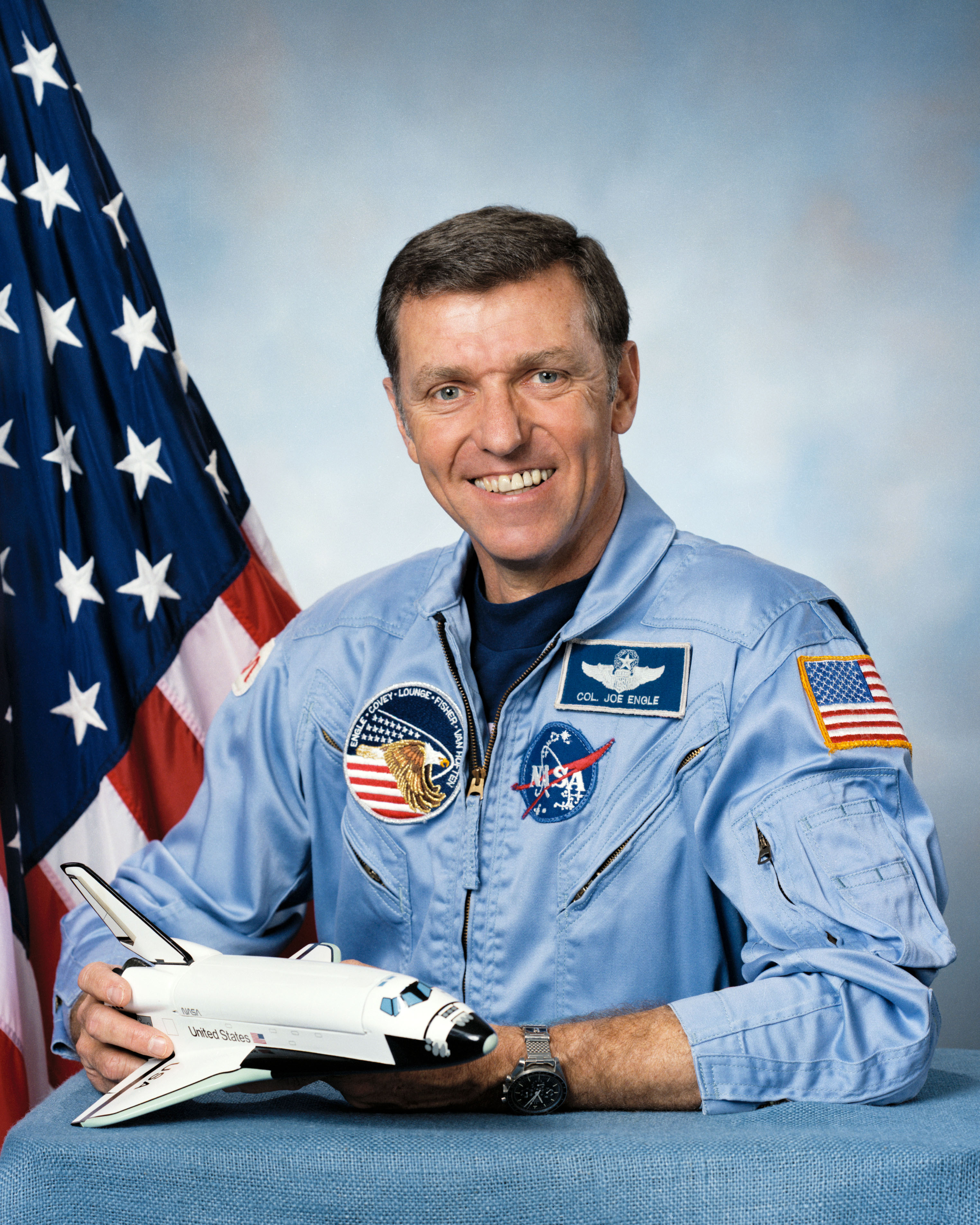
Joe Engle
Class 61C, III

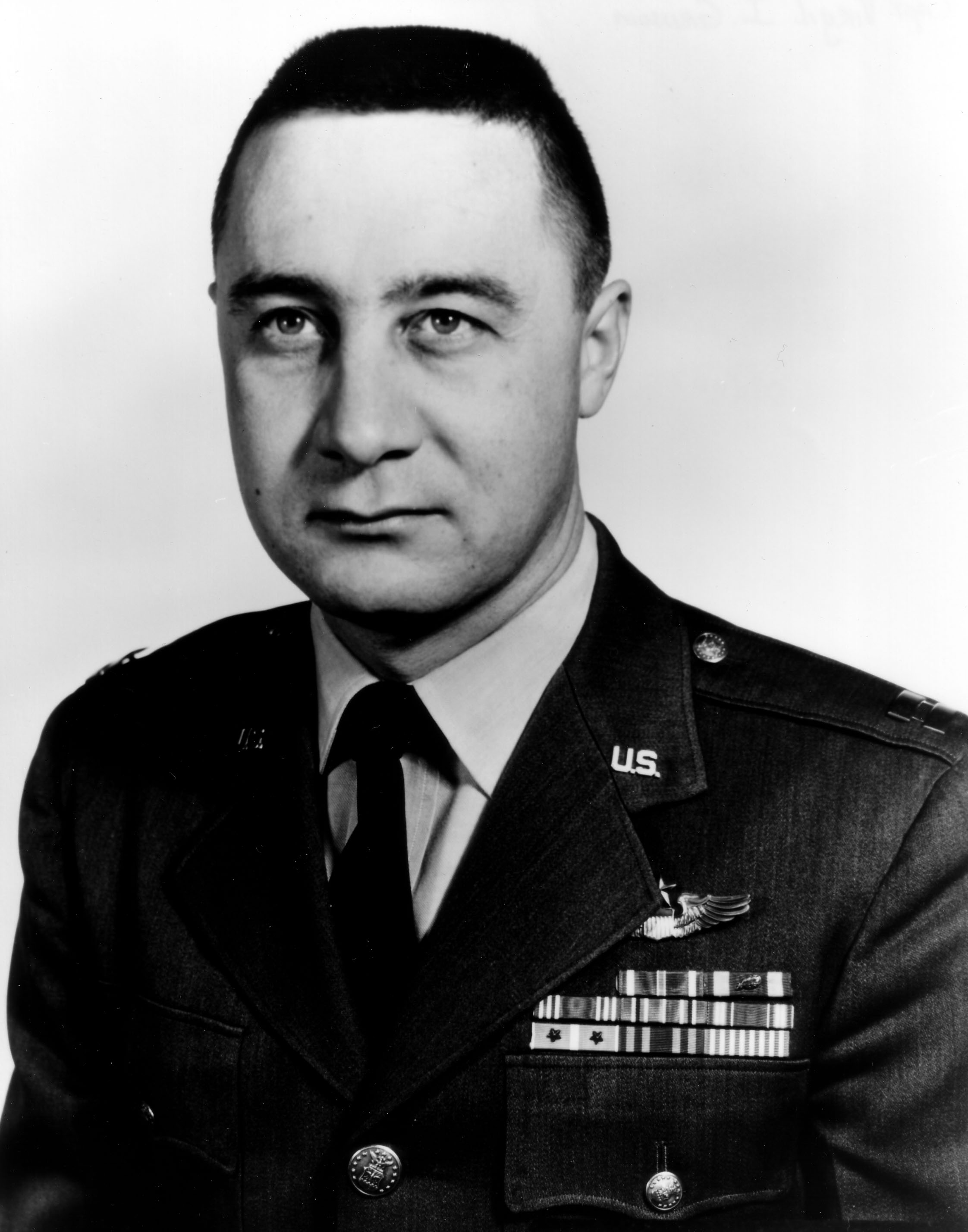
Gus Grissom
Class 56D

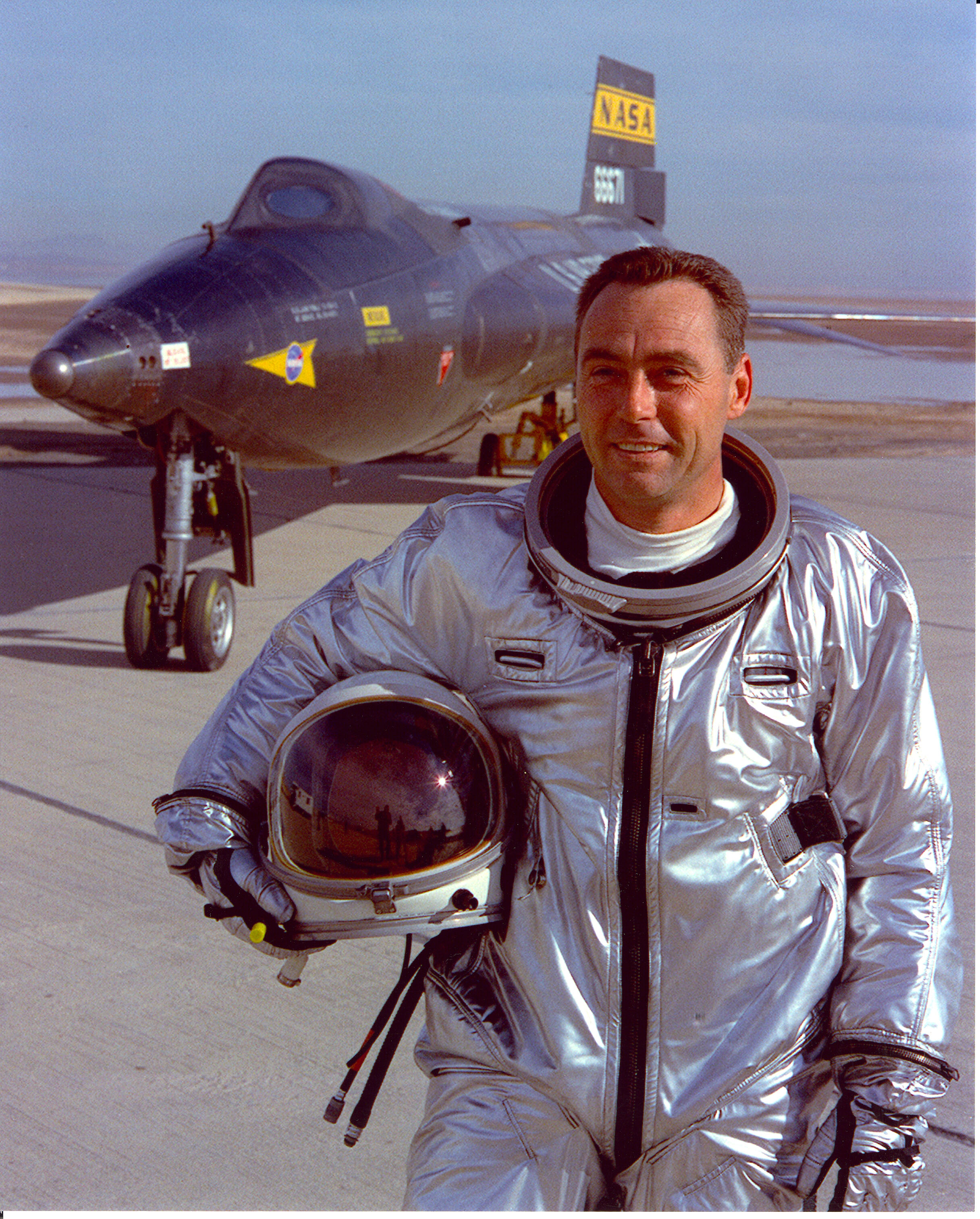
Pete Knight
Class 58C, 63A

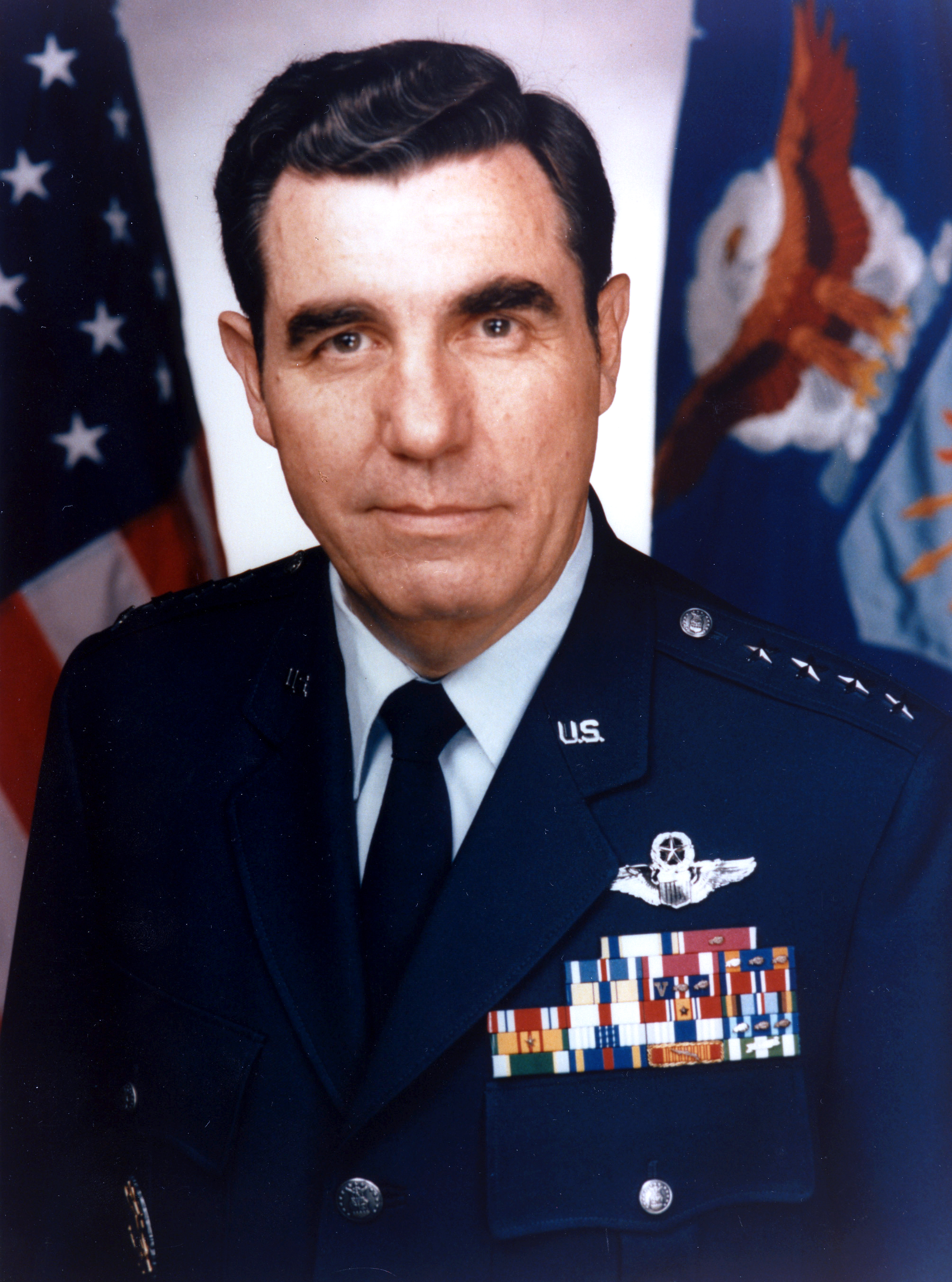
Mike Loh
Class 67B

== See also ==
- List of test pilot schools
