= Benjamin A. Smith II =

American politician and Senator from Massachusetts

Ben Smith
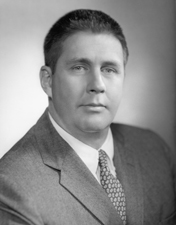

United States Senator from Massachusetts
- In office December 27, 1960 – November 6, 1962
- Appointed by: Foster Furcolo
- Preceded by: John F. Kennedy
- Succeeded by: Ted Kennedy

Mayor of Gloucester
- In office 1954–1955
- Preceded by: Joseph Grillo
- Succeeded by: Beatrice Corliss

Personal details
- Born: Benjamin Atwood Smith II; March 26, 1916 Gloucester, Massachusetts, U.S.
- Died: September 26, 1991 (aged 75) Gloucester, Massachusetts, U.S.
- Party: Democratic
- Children: 5, including Ben
- Education: Harvard University (BA)

Military service
- Allegiance: United States
- Branch/service: United States Navy
- Years of service: 1941–1945
- Rank: Commander
- Battles/wars: World War II
- Awards: Asiatic-Pacific Campaign Medal; World War II Victory Medal

Benjamin Atwood Smith II (March 26, 1916 – September 26, 1991) was an American politician who served as a member of the United States Senate from December 1960 until November 1962.

== Early life and education ==
Smith, who was named for his grandfather Benjamin A. Smith, was born in Gloucester, Massachusetts, to R. Russell Smith and Grace Smith. He married Barbara M. (née Mechem) of Lake Forest, Illinois, and Annisquam, Massachusetts. They had five children, sons R. Russell Smith II and Benjamin A. Smith III, an ice hockey player and coach, and daughters Barbara (Smith) Ramsey, Susan (Smith) Crotty, and Cathleen Smith.

Smith attended the Gloucester public schools. Smith was captain of the 1933 Gloucester High School football team. He later graduated from Governor Dummer Academy and Harvard University. While at Harvard, Smith played fullback on the football team under coach Dick Harlow. At Harvard, Smith was a roommate of John F. Kennedy.

=== Military service ===
Smith served in the United States Navy for four years during World War II. While he was in the Navy, Smith served in the Pacific as Commander on an anti-submarine, anti-torpedo vessel.

== Career ==
Smith served as a member of the Gloucester School Committee and the Gloucester City Council, and was a trustee of the Addison Gilbert Hospital. He served as Mayor of Gloucester from 1954 to 1955; however, at the time Smith was mayor, Gloucester adhered to a Plan E form of government. The office of mayor was a ceremonial position; the mayor was a city councilor chosen by the council. The city administration was carried out by a professional city manager.

For many years Smith was the chief executive of his family's business, the Merchants Box Company in Gloucester.

=== Senate appointment ===
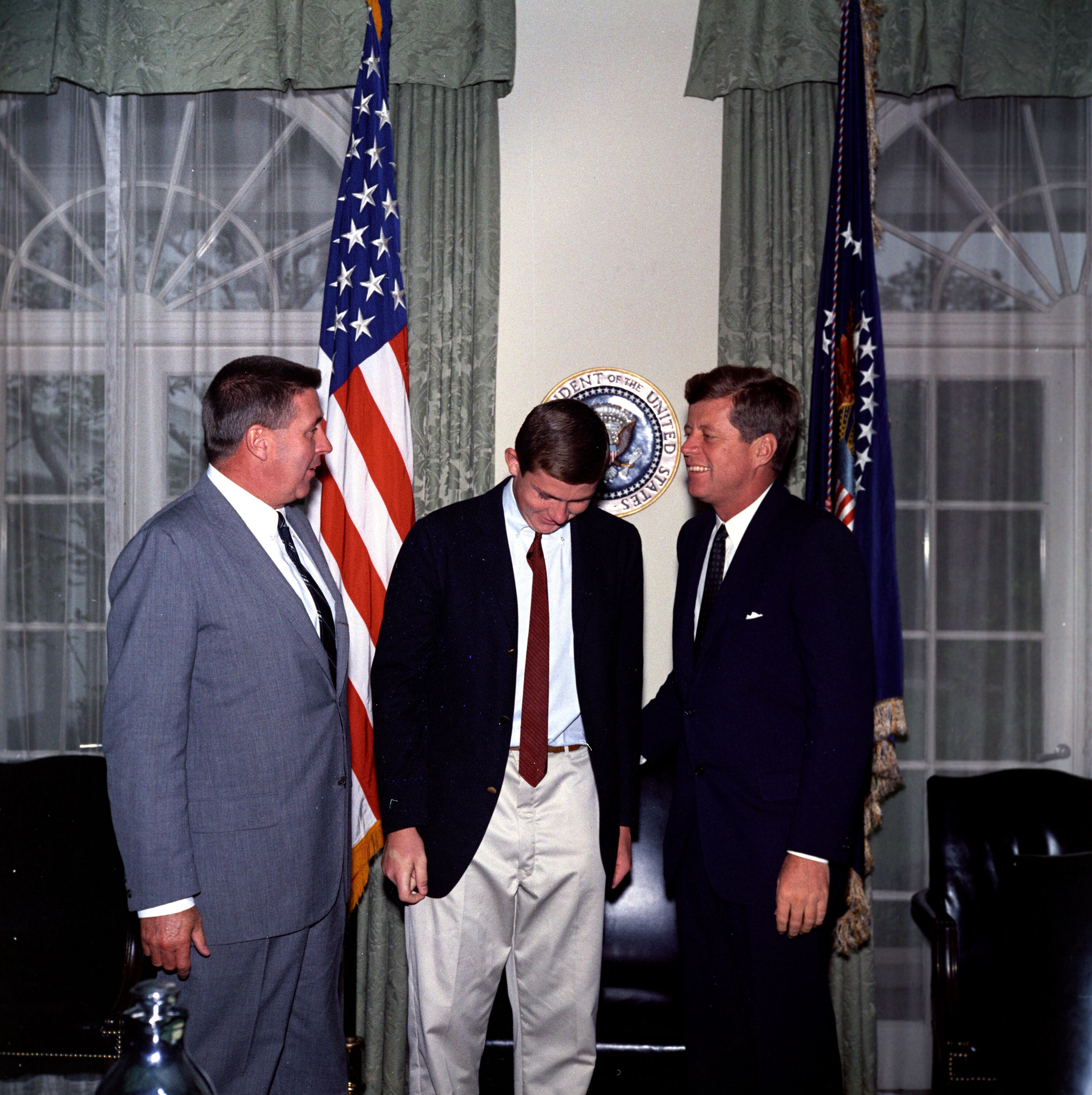
John F. Kennedy (right) with Ben Smith III and Senator Benjamin A. Smith II (left) visiting in the White House.

After being elected President of the United States, John F. Kennedy resigned his seat in the United States Senate on December 22, 1960. Kennedy, who had been reelected to a second Senate term of six years in 1958, advised then-Governor Foster Furcolo to appoint Smith to fill the vacated seat "in the interest of promoting party unity." Smith, a close friend of the Kennedy family, was described as being a "seat warmer" until Kennedy's brother Ted turned thirty, the minimum age to be eligible to serve in the Senate. Smith served as a senator until November 6, 1962, when Ted Kennedy won the special election for the last two years of his brother's term.

=== Special ambassador ===
In 1963, President Kennedy named Smith as the chairman of the U.S. delegation to the North Pacific Fisheries Conference involving the United States, the Soviet Union, Canada and Japan.

== Death and burial ==
Smith died after a long illness in the Addison Gilbert Hospital in Gloucester, Massachusetts, and was buried in the Calvary Cemetery in Gloucester.

U.S. Senate
Preceded by John F. Kennedy	U.S. Senator (Class 1) from Massachusetts; 1960–1962; Served alongside: Leverett Saltonstall	Succeeded by Ted Kennedy
