= J. Barclay Harding =

American journalist (1830–1865)

James Barclay Harding (November 1, 1830 – October 29, 1865) was the publisher of the Philadelphia Evening Telegraph with Charles Edward Warburton.

== Biography ==
He was born on November 1, 1830, to Jesper Harding and Maria Wilson. He died on October 29, 1865.
