= Philadelphia Evening Telegraph =

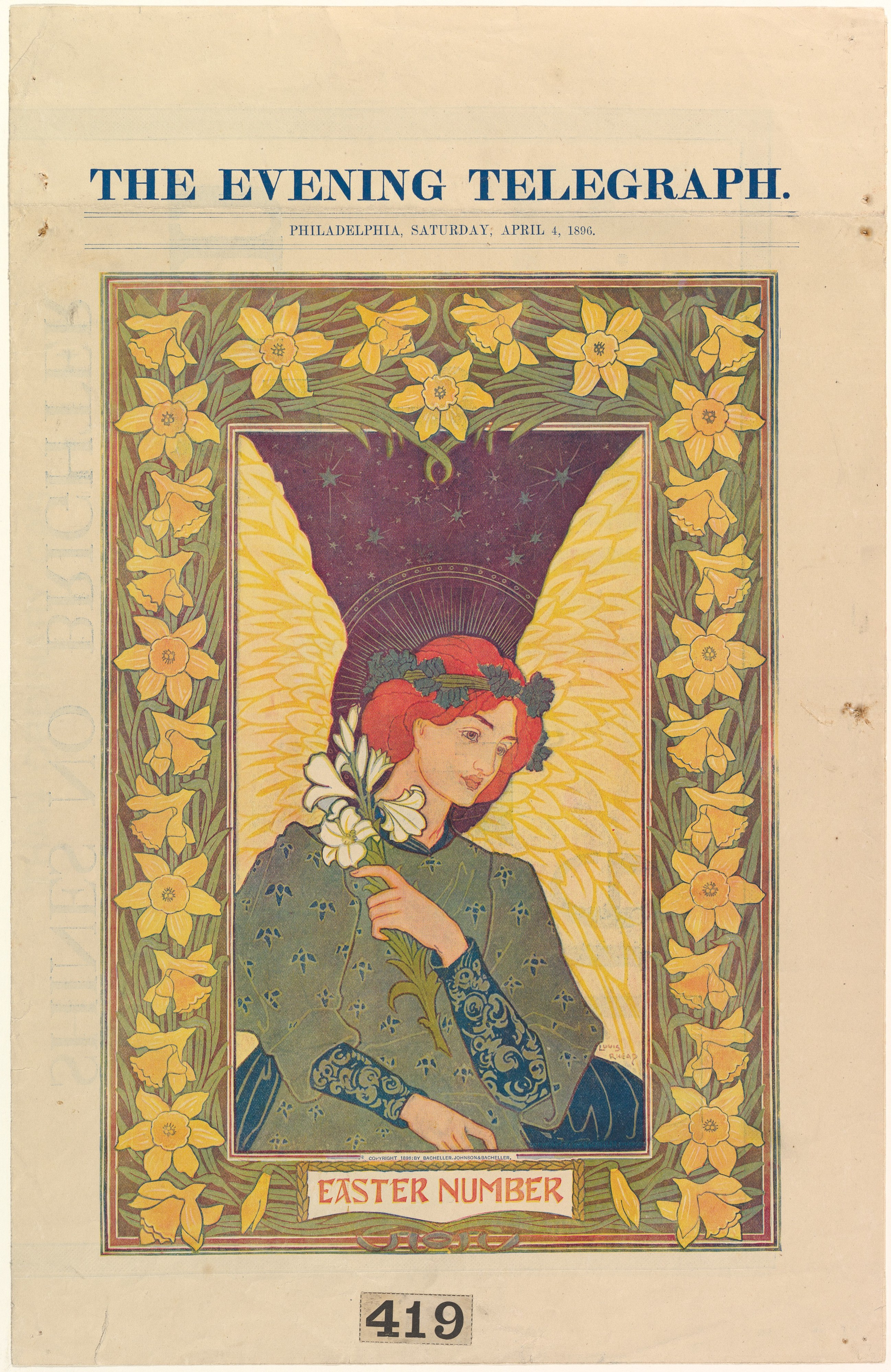
An April 1896 poster for the Evening Telegraph

The Philadelphia Evening Telegraph was a newspaper published in Philadelphia, Pennsylvania, from 1864 to 1918.

== History ==
=== 19th century ===
The paper was started on January 4, 1864, by James Barclay Harding and Charles Edward Warburton. Warburton served as publisher until 1896, when he passed the newspaper and the publisher's job to Barclay Harding Warburton I.

=== 20th century ===
In 1911, Barclay Warburton sold the paper to Rodman Wanamaker, who ran it until it closed in 1918. Bought out by Cyrus Curtis, owner of the Public Ledger, Curtis merged the Telegraph into the Ledger and thus acquired an Associated Press membership. The Ledger carried the full name of Evening Public Ledger and The Evening Telegraph through the end of 1918, and then dropped the Telegraph addition.
