= William T. Warburton =

American politician (1852–1922)

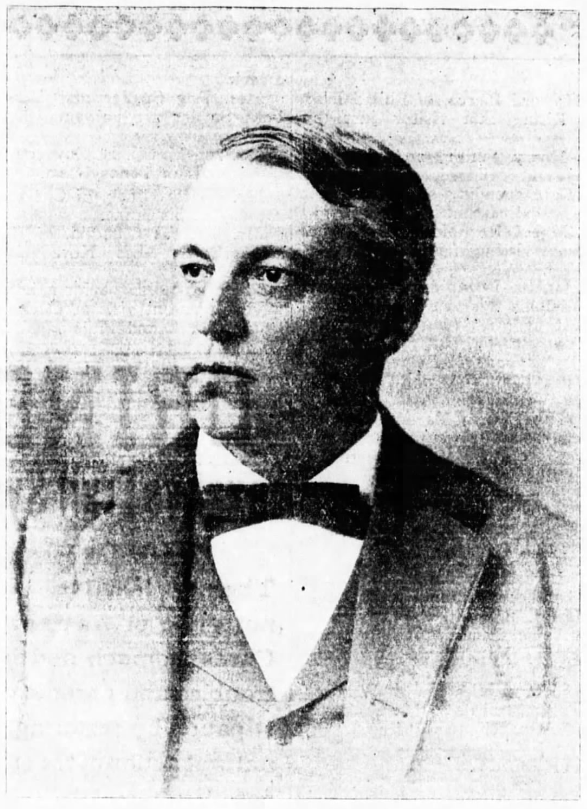
- Warburton in 1907 newspaper

Member of the Maryland House of Delegates from the Cecil County district
- In office 1912–1912 Serving with D. Frank Clendenin and Walter I. Smith

Personal details
- Born: July 16, 1852 near Bay View, Maryland, U.S.
- Died: February 28, 1922 (aged 69) Elkton, Maryland, U.S.
- Resting place: Elkton Cemetery
- Party: Republican
- Spouse: Matilda McFarland (m. 1877)
- Children: 2
- Education: Delaware College
- Occupation: Politician; lawyer; bank president

William T. Warburton (July 16, 1852 – February 28, 1922) was an American politician, lawyer and bank president from Maryland. He served as a member of the Maryland House of Delegates, representing Cecil County in 1912.

== Early life ==
William T. Warburton was born on July 16, 1852, on a farm near Bay View, Maryland, to Elizabeth (née McCauley) and William Thomas Warburton. His father was a farmer and Methodist preacher. His uncle James McCauley was chief judge of the orphans' court and his uncle Daniel McCauley was a county commissioner in Baltimore. Warburton studied at West Nottingham Academy and graduated from Delaware College in 1871. He read law under Reuben Haines and was admitted to the bar in Cecil County in 1874.

== Career ==
Warburton was a lawyer. He served as state's attorney for Cecil County. In the 1880s, he served as counsel for William N. Singerly and later was counsel of the Baltimore and Ohio Railroad.

Warburton was a Republican. He was a delegate to the 1888 Republican National Convention. He was a member of the Maryland House of Delegates, representing Cecil County, in 1912. In 1915, Warburton ran for the Republican nomination for governor of Maryland, but lost to Ovington Weller. He ran for Maryland Senate in 1917, but lost to Omar D. Crothers. He attended the 1888 Republican National Convention and one of the conventions that nominated William Howard Taft. Until 1919 or 1920, he was a member of the State Board of Education.

Warburton worked as cashier and later became president of the Second National Bank of Elkton. He served in that role until his death. He was owner and president of the Elkton Electric Light & Power Company and later the Gilpin Falls Electric Company. He was president of the Citizens' Mutual Fire Insurance Company of Cecil County and the Maryland Water Company. He also served as director of the Singerly Pulp and Paper Mills of Elkton and the Lancaster, Cecil & Southern Railroad Company. He was a trustee of the Elkton Academy.

== Personal life ==
On January 2, 1877, Warburton married Matilda McFarland, daughter of Richard McFarland. They had two sons and one daughter, Henry A., Charles E. and Emma. He bought an apple farm near where he was born for a reported US$100,000. He lived at North Main Street in Elkton.

Warburton died from pneumonia on February 28, 1922, at his home in Elkton. He was buried at Elkton Cemetery.
