= William Warburton (Dean of Elphin) =

William Warburton (Dean of Elphin) (b Dublin 22 October 1806 - d Chislehurst 3 May 1900) was an Anglican priest in Ireland.

Warburton was educated at Trinity College, Dublin. He was Dean of Elphin from 1848 until 1898.

== Family ==
The Very Reverend William Warburton D.D. (1806-1900) was the fourth son of Richard Warburton of Garryhinch, County Laois, Ireland. He married firstly Emma Margaret Stovin on 18 May 1835 at Leamington, Warwickshire, England. He married secondly Emily Bland on 25 March 1878 at Bayonne, France. He died aged 93 on 3 May 1900 in 'Birchwood', Chislehurst in the London Borough of Bromley, England.
