= Lucy Warburton =

Lucy Warburton may refer to:

- Lucy Warburton, in the US supernatural drama TV series The Leftovers, played by Amanda Warren
- Lucy Warburton (tennis), British tennis player who played in 2008 Nordea Danish Open – Singles
