= Ernest K. Warburton (US Air Force) =

United States Air Force general

Brigadier General Ernest K. Warburton was an American flier in the United States Army Air Corps and a senior officer in the US Air Force.

Warburton was born at Norwood, Massachusetts, in 1904. He graduated from the Massachusetts Institute of Technology with a bachelor of science degree in 1926 and was commissioned a second lieutenant in the Air Service Reserve on June 8, 1926.

Warburton won his Junior Air Pilot wings at Brooks Field in March 1927, and his Air Pilot wings at Kelly Field in 1928. In February 1929, he received a commission as a second lieutenant in the Air Corps. In 1931 he entered the Air Corps Engineering School at Wright Field. On graduation a year later, Warburton joined the 94th Pursuit Squadron at Selfridge Field.

Warburton flew the air mail on the mountain run between Newark, New Jersey and Cleveland, during the period the Army took over this service. He later became chief of the Air Materiel Command's Flight Test Division at Wright Field. During this latter period he flew more than 2,500 hours as an experimental test pilot and tested some 250 different types of aircraft. He also flight tested numerous English, Japanese, and German aircraft during World War II.

In September 1944 Warburton became deputy chief of staff for Plans of the Far East Air Service Command and the following December he assumed command of the 46th Air Service Group. It was during this period that he commanded the troops that made the first landing in Japan to prepare for the arrival of General Douglas MacArthur.

Warburton was serving as vice commander of the 9th Air Force under Tactical Air Command in 1952, when he went to Korea as deputy chief of staff, Operations, for Fifth Air Force. Later he became deputy commander of Fifth Air Force with the added duty of commanding general of the Taegu Area Command.

In June 1957, Warburton took command of the Air Force Operational Test Center under the Air Proving Ground Command. In December 1957, he became deputy commander for Development and Test of the Air Proving Ground Center, following the merger of the Air Proving Ground Command and the Air Force Armament Center.

Warburton died on April 27, 1986.

== See also ==
- U.S. Air Force Test Pilot School
