= Charles E. Warburton =

American journalist (1837–1896)

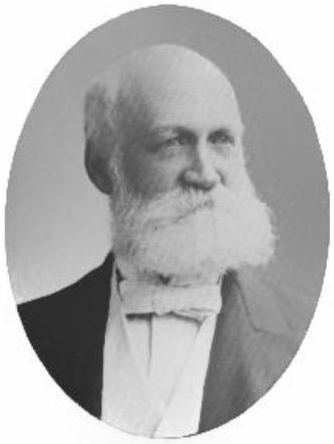
- Born: Charles Edward Warburton; March 2, 1837; Philadelphia
- Died: September 1, 1896 (aged 59); Atlantic City, New Jersey
- Employer: Philadelphia Evening Telegraph
- Children: Barclay Harding Warburton I

Charles Edward Warburton (March 2, 1837 – September 1, 1896) was the publisher of the Philadelphia Evening Telegraph with James Barclay Harding.

== Biography ==
He was born on March 2, 1837, in Philadelphia. He started the Philadelphia Evening Telegraph in 1864.

He died on September 1, 1896, in Atlantic City, New Jersey. At his death his son, Barclay Harding Warburton I took over as publisher.
