= Barclay H. Warburton III =

American politician

Barclay Harding Warburton III

Member of the Massachusetts House of Representatives from the 2nd Essex district
- In office 1955–1959
- Preceded by: Augustus Gardner Means
- Succeeded by: Beatrice Corliss

Personal details
- Born: February 5, 1922 Philadelphia
- Died: May 1, 1983 (aged 61) Newport, Rhode Island
- Party: Republican
- Spouse(s): Margaret McKean Read (1949-1959; divorce); Lore M. Faught (1970-1983; his death)
- Education: United States Merchant Marine Academy (1942); Harvard University (1948)

Barclay Harding Warburton III (February 5, 1922 – May 1, 1983) was founder of the American Sail Training Association, now Tall Ships America.

== Early life ==
Warburton was born to Barclay Harding Warburton II and Rosamund Lancaster. In 1936 his father died in a hunting accident. His mother later married William Kissam Vanderbilt II. In 1949, Warburton turned over his stepfather's estate, Eagle's Nest, to the public. Eagle's Nest became the Vanderbilt Museum.

Warburton graduated from St. Mark's School and the United States Merchant Marine Academy. He served in the United States Navy during World War II and graduated from Harvard University in 1948.

== Politics ==
In 1949, he and his wife, Margaret McKean Read, daughter of Margarett Sargent, moved to Saracen Farm in Ipswich, Massachusetts. From 1953 to 1955 he was a member of the Ipswich Board of Selectmen. In 1954 he was elected to the Massachusetts House of Representatives. He resigned from the House in 1959 amid a public scandal surrounding his marriage.

== Sailing ==
After his resignation, Warburton settled in Newport, Rhode Island. In 1967, he founded the Black Pearl Restaurant, named after his yacht. In 1970 he married Lore M. Faught. In 1972, Warburton sailed to England for the international sail training races from Cowes to Kiel. Afterwards, Warburton set out to create an American sailing organization similar to the international one that organized that race. This led to him and some of his fellow sailing enthusiasts in Newport to found the American Sail Training Association. In 1976 the American Sail Training Association brought 100 Tall Ships to Newport, Philadelphia and Boston to celebrate the American bicentennial.

== Death ==
Warburton died on May 1, 1983, at the age of 61.

== See also ==
- 1955–1956 Massachusetts legislature
