= George Warburton (footballer, born 1934) =

Welsh footballer

Personal information
- Full name: George Warburton
- Date of birth: 13 September 1934 (age 92)
- Place of birth: Brymbo, Wales
- Position: Right back

Senior career*
Years	Team	Apps	(Gls)
- Pentre Broughton
- Brymbo Steelworks
1957–1960	Wrexham	22	(0)
1960–1961	Barrow	14	(0)
- Morecambe
- Netherfield
- Holywell Town
- Colwyn Bay
- Blaenau Ffestiniog Amateur
Total		36+	(0+)
- * Club domestic league appearances and goals

George Warburton (born 13 September 1934) is a Welsh former professional footballer who played as a right back.

== Career ==
Born in Brymbo, Warburton began his career with local clubs Pentre Broughton and Brymbo Steelworks. He then made 36 appearances in the Football League for Wrexham and Barrow between 1957 and 1961, before playing non-league football with Morecambe and Netherfield, before ending his career back in Wales with Holywell Town, Colwyn Bay and Blaenau Ffestiniog Amateur.
