= Barclay Harding Warburton I =

American newspaper publisher (1866–1954)

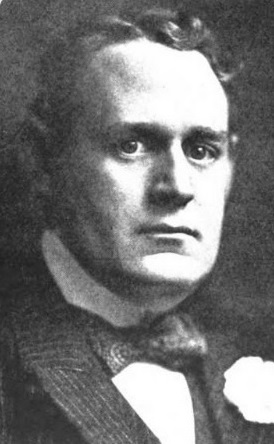
- From 1912's The History of Battery A (formerly Known as the Keystone Battery): And Troop A, N.G.P.
- Born: February 1, 1866; Philadelphia, Pennsylvania, U.S.
- Died: December 5, 1954 (aged 88); Philadelphia, Pennsylvania, U.S.
- Employer: Philadelphia Evening Telegraph
- Political party: Republican
- Spouse: Mary Brown Wanamaker (m. 1895–1954)
- Children: Mary Brown Warburton (1896–1937); Barclay Harding Warburton II (1898–1936); C. Egerton Warburton (1903-1973)
- Parent: Charles Edward Warburton

Major Barclay Harding Warburton I (April 1, 1866 – December 5, 1954) was the publisher of the Philadelphia Evening Telegraph.

== Biography ==
He was born on April 1, 1866, in Philadelphia to Charles Edward Warburton. At the death of his father he became the publisher of the Philadelphia Evening Telegraph.

On June 13, 1895, he married Mary Brown Wanamaker (1871–1954). They had three children: Mary Brown Warburton, (1896–1937); Barclay Harding Warburton II, (1898–1936); and C. Egerton Warburton, (1902–1973).

During the Spanish–American War he was commissioned as captain of Light Battery A of the Pennsylvania Artillery. He was mustered into service on May 6, 1898, and served with the battery in Puerto Rico from August 10 to September 3. He then returned to the United States and was mustered out with the battery on November 9, 1898. After the war, he became a member of the Pennsylvania Commandery of the Military Order of Foreign Wars.

During World War I, Warburton served as chargé d'affaires for President Wilson in London from 1914 until 1917 when he became one of General Pershing's aides de camp in Paris with the rank of major. He was known by his military rank for the rest of his life.

In 1921 he was named as the Special Police Commissioner for Philadelphia by Mayor Joseph Hampton Moore.

On February 8, 1928, Warburton became mayor of Palm Beach, Florida, one day after being elected. In that election, he received 482 votes, versus 100 votes for John M. Clifton, 42 votes for Benjamin Hoffman, and 29 votes for Franklin P. Eastman. During Warburton's tenure as mayor, the town of Palm Beach was struck by the 1928 Okeechobee hurricane. He learned news of the disaster while visiting Philadelphia, but his return trip to Palm Beach took five days due to the storm's movement up the East Coast of the United States. In his absence, town officials declared martial law, before deciding on the following day to not enforce the order.

Within a week of the 1928 hurricane, Warburton announced that the storm would not affect the winter season in Palm Beach, although the famous Royal Poinciana Hotel sustained enough damage that it was unable to reopen until 1929. Warburton's own estate suffered significant water damage, as well as the loss of a houseboat. He estimated that the hurricane damaged 610 buildings, 60 homes, and 10 hotels in Palm Beach, with losses totaling about $2.21 million. Warburton joined other local officials, such as West Palm Beach mayor Vincent Oaksmith and Miami mayor E. G. Sewell in convincing the Florida Legislature and United States Congress to adopt flood control measures at Lake Okeechobee, as the storm claimed at least 2,500 lives, most of them after wind-driven waves breached existing levees and swamped nearby farming communities.

In February 1929, Warburton officially ran unopposed for a second consecutive term as of mayor of Palm Beach and received 291 votes, although around 50 votes were cast among about 10 write-in candidates. However, he resigned in November of that year after suffering significant financial losses in the Wall Street crash and accepting year-round work with EF Hutton. James M. Owen Jr. served the remainder of Warburton's term.

His daughter, Mary Brown Warburton (1896–1937), died in 1937 of an overdose of heroin or morphine.

He died on December 5, 1954.

Party political offices
Vacant Title last held by William R. O'Neal	Republican nominee for United States Senator from Florida (Class 1); 1928	Vacant Title next held by Howard C. Babcock
