= Denis Sullivan (schooner) =

Schooner from Wisconsin, United States

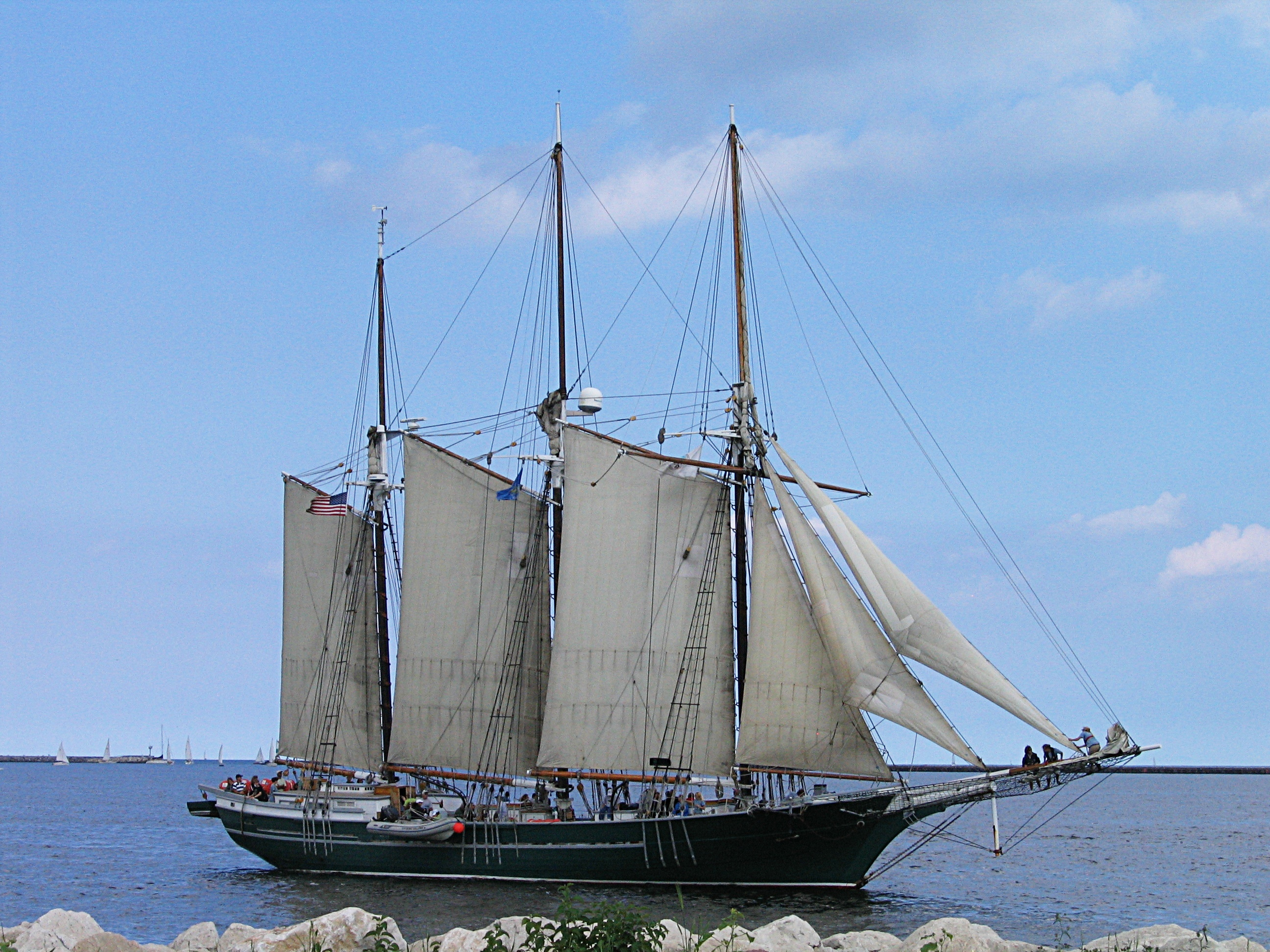
- Denis Sullivan under partial sail off the Milwaukee lakefront

History

United States
- Name: Denis Sullivan
- Owner: World Ocean School
- Completed: 2000, Milwaukee, Wisconsin
- Home port: Milwaukee, Wisconsin
- Identification: IMO number: 1100209; MMSI number: 338327000; Callsign: WDA2917

General characteristics
- Type: Schooner
- Tonnage: 97 GT
- Displacement: 150 tons
- Length: 137 ft (42 m) overall; 98 ft (30 m) on deck
- Beam: 24 ft (7.3 m)
- Height: 95 ft (29 m)
- Draft: 8.75 ft (2.67 m)
- Propulsion: Sail; two 180 hp (130 kW) auxiliary engines
- Sail plan: Gaff rigged; ten sails, 4,597 square feet (427.1 m^{2}) total sail area
- Capacity: 31 persons overnight, 60 on day sails (including crew)
- Crew: 10

SV Denis Sullivan is a three-masted wooden gaff rigged schooner originally from Milwaukee, Wisconsin. The only existing replica of a 19th-century Great Lakes schooner, she was envisioned and built by a Milwaukee-based team of professionals and volunteers and was owned by the museum Discovery World. She was the flagship of both the state of Wisconsin and of the United Nations Environment Programme until Discovery World controversially sold her to the World Ocean School in late 2022. She then moved to Boston, Massachusetts, where World Ocean School is located, although her home port is still listed as Milwaukee for ceremonial reasons and because World Ocean School plans on maintaining her connection with the city.

== History ==
The construction of the Denis Sullivan was first proposed in 1989 by a group of Milwaukee residents and volunteers from other states. Called Milwaukee Lake Schooner Ltd., their plan was to build a tall ship which would serve as a platform for educating people about the Great Lakes. The ship was primarily designed by naval architect Tim Graul of Sturgeon Bay, and the keel was built by Peterson Builders. Community involvement was welcome in the project, and almost a thousand people donated almost a million volunteer hours toward the Denis Sullivan's construction. The Menominee Nation donated six large white pine trees to become her masts.

Through the efforts of both professional shipwrights and volunteers, the ship was partially completed and launched in June 2000. She was named the Denis Sullivan after prominent backer Jere Sullivan's grandfather Denis Sullivan, who was once the longest-serving ship captain on the Great Lakes aboard the schooner Moonlight (built in Milwaukee in 1874). She departed Milwaukee for her first sail to the Caribbean in November 2000, where Capt. Mark Crutcher was the first captain.

The Milwaukee Lake Schooner Ltd. later changed their name to the Wisconsin Lake Schooner Education Association (WLSEA), which merged with Pier Wisconsin to become the Discovery World museum.

Educational programs aboard the Denis Sullivan were originally developed by Bill Nimke (head of development at University School of Milwaukee) and Caroline Joyce (Director of Water Education Programs at the UW-Milwaukee Center for Great Lakes Studies) before being taken over by Discovery World.

Folk singer Pete Seeger recorded a song called "The Schooner Denis Sullivan" in 2001. That song was featured on Milwaukee folk singer David HB Drake's 2004 album A Schooner Songbag, a compilation of traditional and original songs performed by people involved with the Denis Sullivan. David HB Drake was the resident shantyman (the crew member who coordinated the sea shanties used in operating a tall ship) of the Denis Sullivan from its inception until its departure from Milwaukee in 2022.

== Sale to World Ocean School ==
When the COVID-19 pandemic hit in March 2020, the Denis Sullivan's two remaining permanent crew members, captain Tiffany Krihwan and chief mate Jonny Slanga, were furloughed indefinitely. Discovery World kept the Denis Sullivan docked and unused throughout the 2020, 2021, and 2023 seasons, as they did not have a licensed captain to sail with. Amphitrite Digital, the owner of Chicago's tall ship Windy, approached Discovery world about buying the Denis Sullivan and operating her in Milwaukee, but Discovery World did not want to sell the ship to a for-profit company who would not be using the ship for educational purposes.

In September 2022 Discovery World announced they sold the Denis Sullivan for an undisclosed amount to World Ocean School in Boston, Massachusetts. The sale came as a surprise to the Friends of the Denis Sullivan, who were disappointed that Discovery World did not communicate the sale ahead of time and did not give volunteers and residents (as well as the original organizers) the ability to pursue other options for the ship. They were also disappointed in the sale of the ship to an East Coast area that already has a large number of tall ships, as opposed to keeping it on the Great Lakes which has few. Others expressed disappointment that prominent Milwaukee institutions did not do more to keep the ship in the city.

The ship departed Milwaukee under motor for Boston, accompanied by a flotilla of local boats, on October 8, 2022. After going through restoration and repairs in St. Petersburg, Florida, she arrived at the World Ocean School location in Saint Croix in mid-December.

== Design ==
The Denis Sullivan is not a replica of a specific vessel. Rather, her design is inspired by that of the Great Lakes cargo schooners of the 19th century. Like many of those schooners, she carries a raffee, a square-rigged fore topsail which is triangular in shape.

In designing the Denis Sullivan, architects Timothy Graul Marine Services looked to several nineteenth century Great Lakes schooners for inspiration, including the Rouse Simmons, Clipper City, and Alvin Clark. Above the waterline, the Sullivan closely resembles these earlier vessels. Her shape is that of an efficient cargo carrier, and her rigging and deck arrangement are likewise authentic. She differs from her predecessors, however, below the waterline. Traditionally, Great Lakes cargo schooners were built with a fairly flat bottom to minimize draft and permit sailing in shallow waters. They carried a centerboard to compensate for this when sailing to windward. The Denis Sullivan strayed from this tradition to meet both modern Coast Guard safety requirements and the practical considerations of a passenger vessel. She has a relatively deep hull and weighted keel, which provide greater stability to the vessel and allow for 6 feet 4 inches (1.93 m) of head clearance in the below decks accommodations. An additional concession to safety regulations was the division of the traditional cargo hold into watertight bulkheads.

== See also ==
- List of schooners
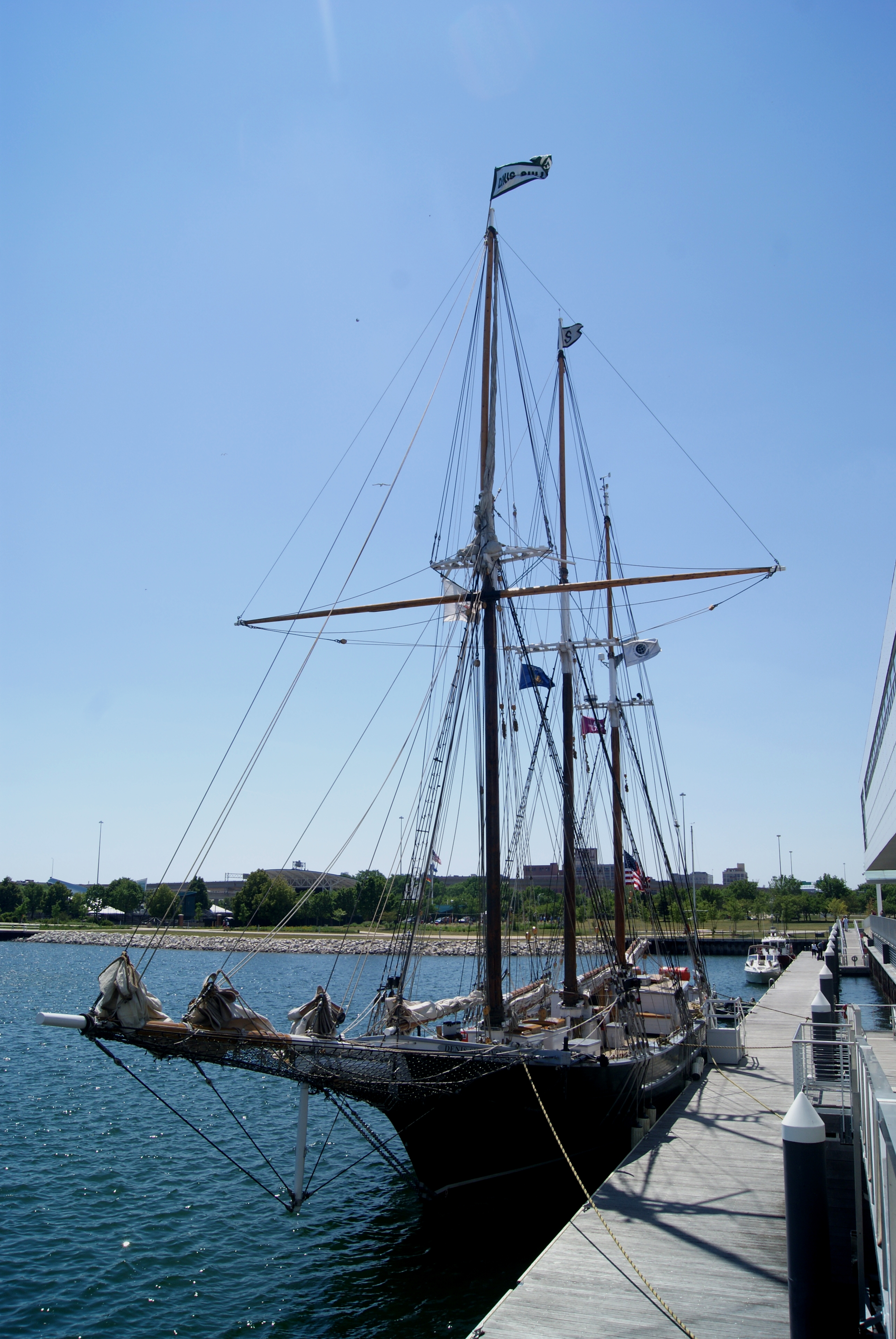
Denis Sullivan at Pier Wisconsin June 9, 2012

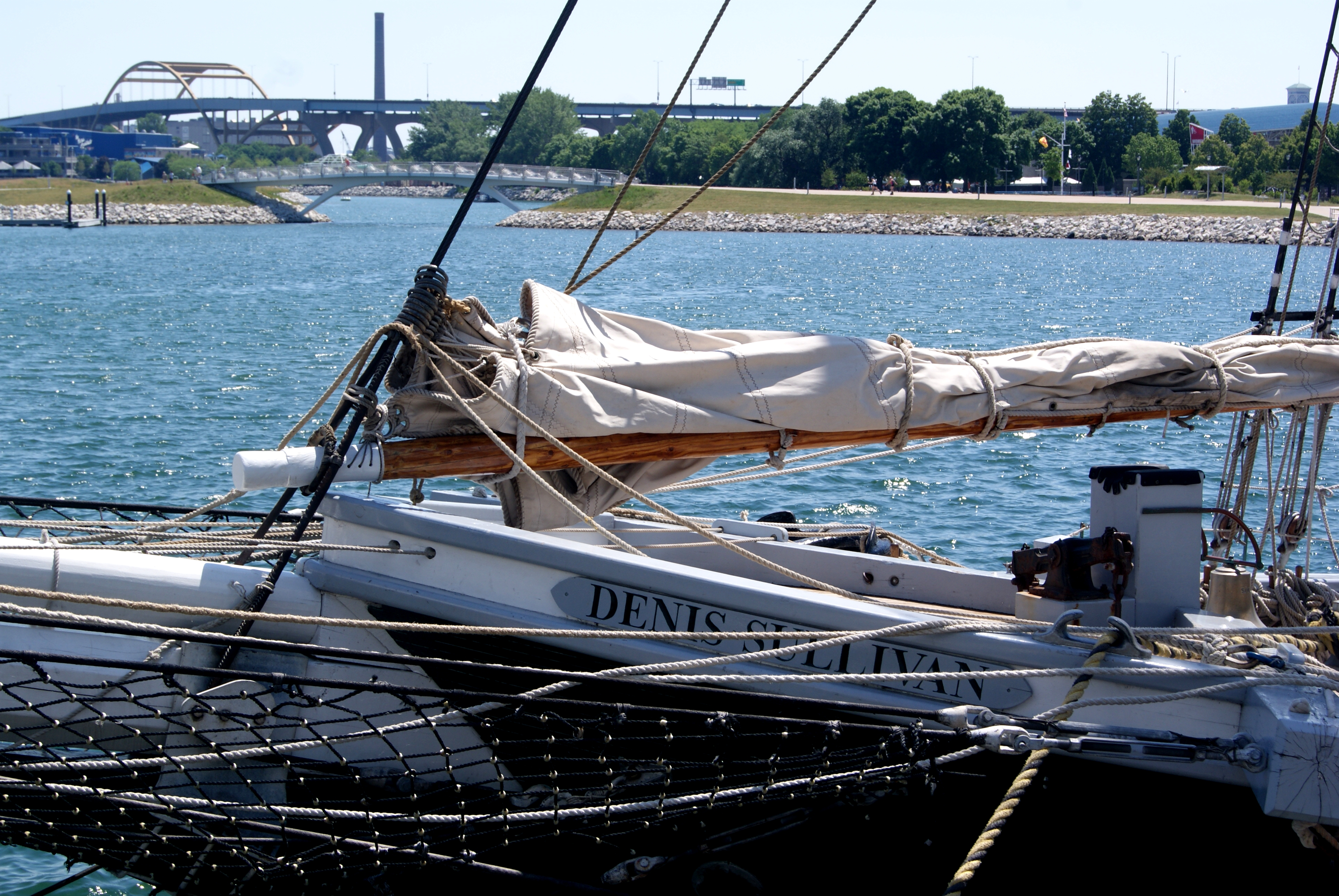
Denis Sullivan (detail of prow)

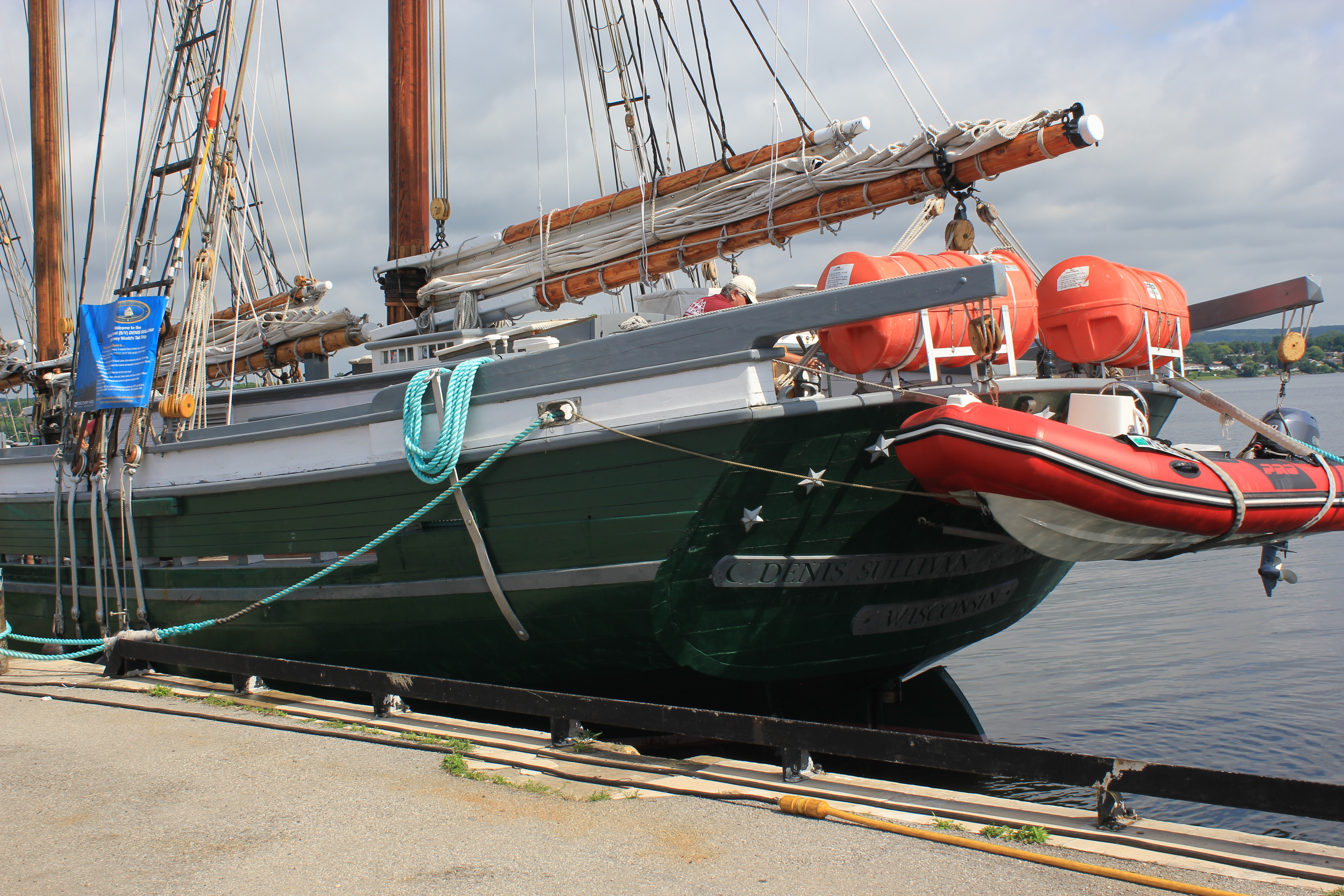
Denis Sullivan at Hamilton, Ontario, Canada

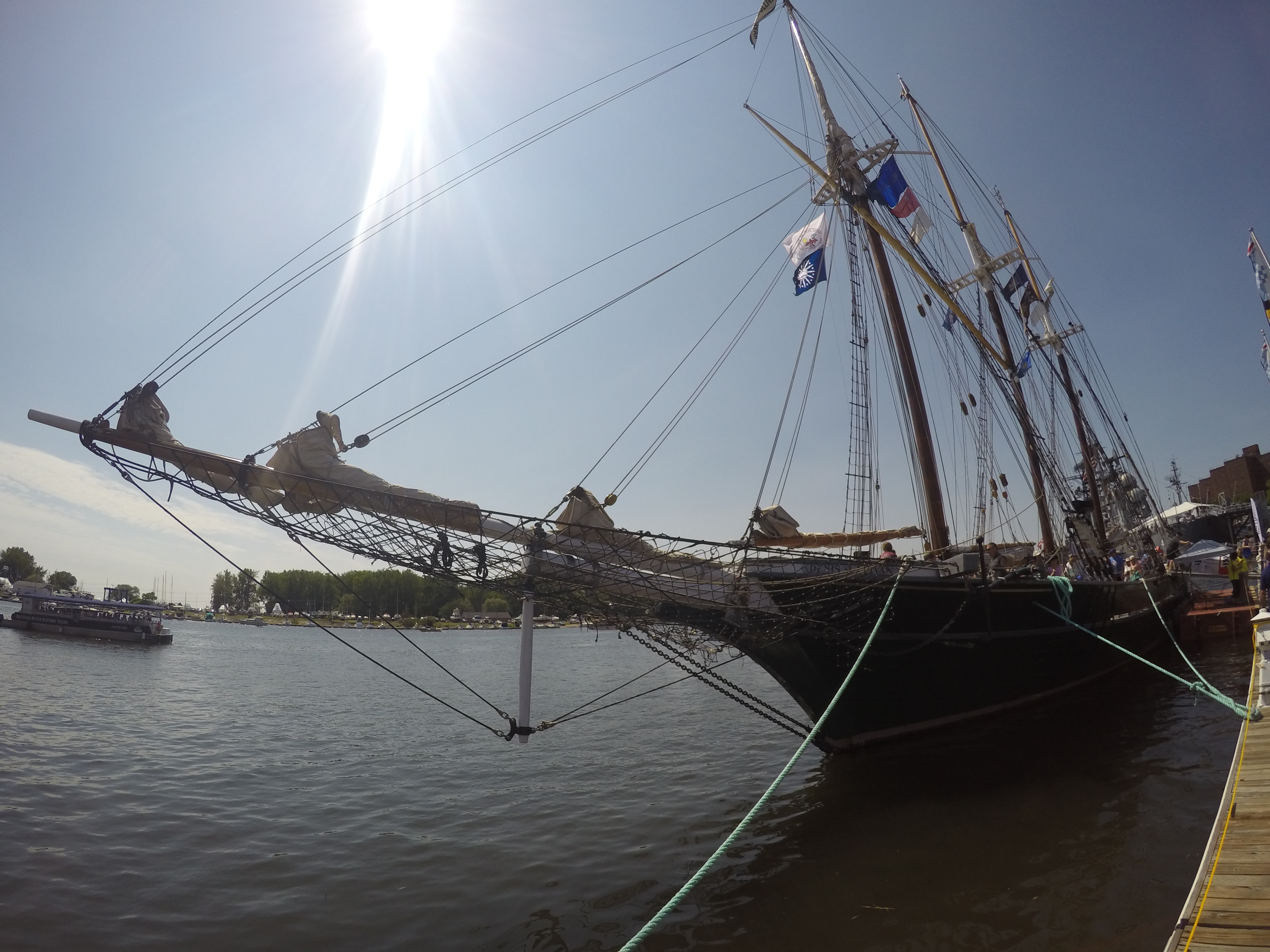
July 9, 2019 Buffalo Tall Ships Festival Buffalo, New York

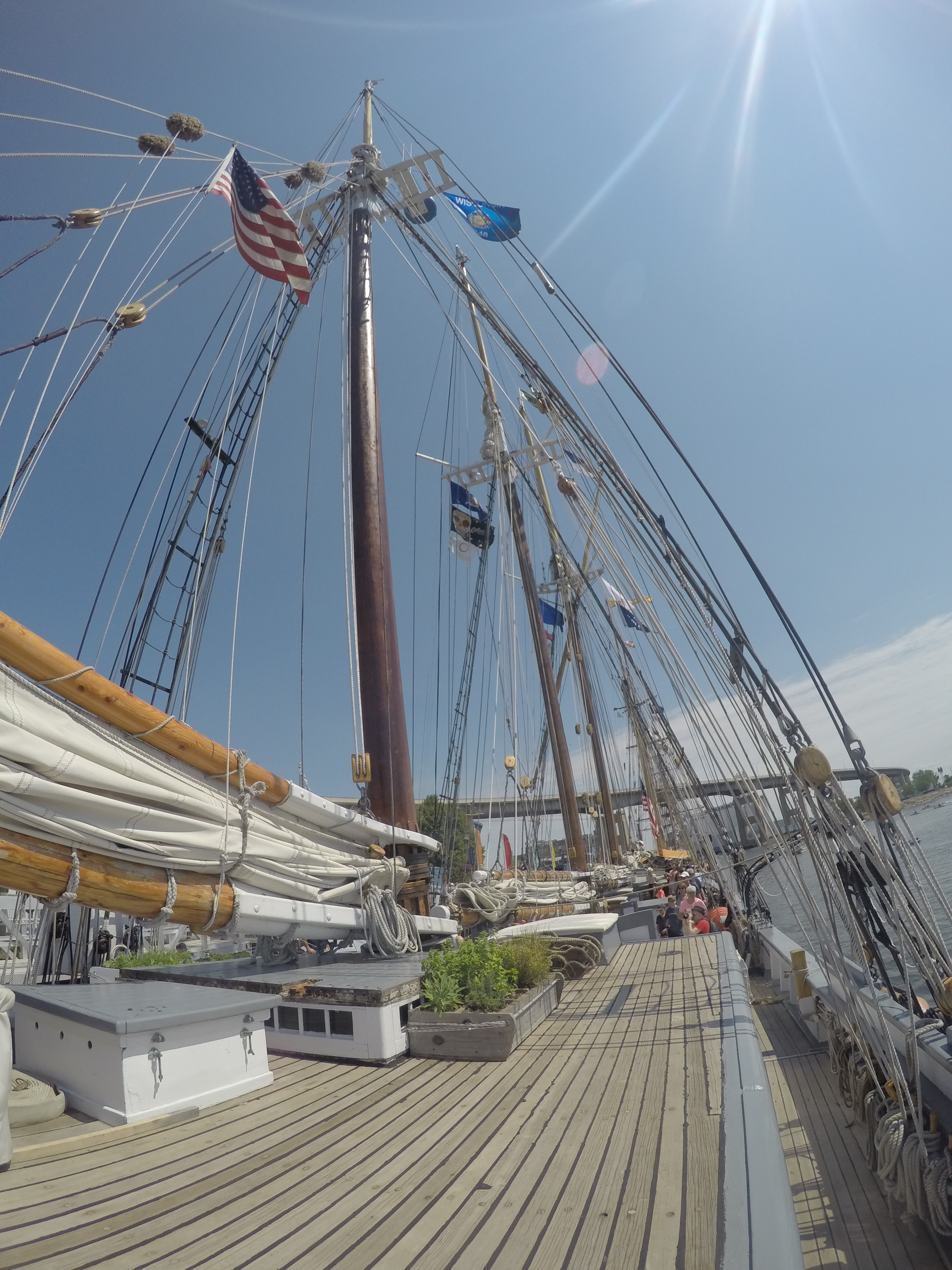
Deck of Denis Sullivan during Tall Ships Buffalo, New York July 7, 2019
