= Wind Leaves =

Wind Leaves may refer to:

- Wind Leaves (Kahn), a public artwork in Milwaukee, Wisconsin
- Wind Leaves (Kister), a public artwork in Indianapolis, Indiana
