= Ned Kahn =

American environmental artist and sculptor

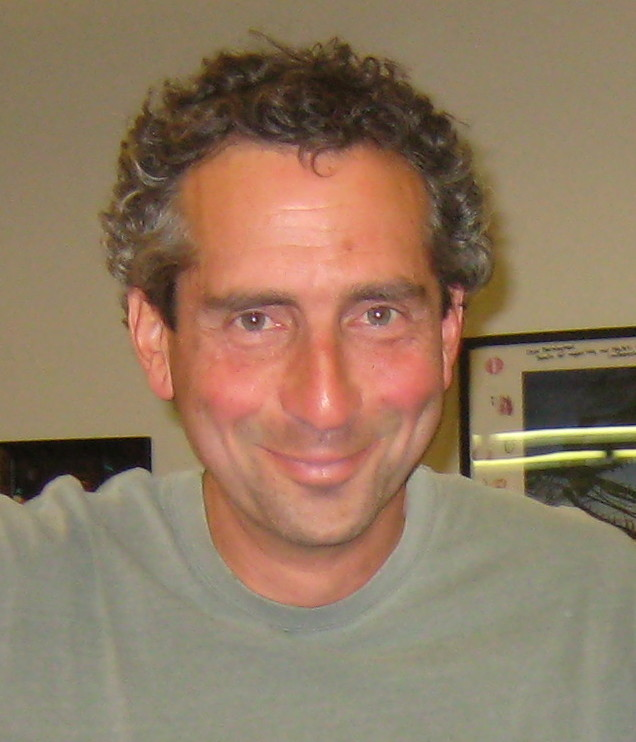
- Kahn, photographed in 2008
- Born: 1959 or 1960 (age 66–67)
- Education: University of Connecticut
- Awards: MacArthur Fellows Program; 2003; National Design Award; 2005
- Website: nedkahn.com

Ned Kahn is an environmental artist and sculptor, known in particular for museum exhibits, one of which is the Exploratorium in San Francisco. His work usually intends to make an invisible aspect of nature, visible.

== Early life ==
Kahn was born in New York City and raised in Stamford, Connecticut. At the age of 10, he staged his first exhibition of sculptures fashioned from salvaged junkyard items, where his mother had taken him.

After graduating with a degree in botany and environmental science from the University of Connecticut, in 1982, Kahn moved to San Francisco, where he was fascinated by the Exploratorium. He worked there from 1982 to 1996 under the tutelage of the museum's founder, Frank Oppenheimer. In 2001, Kahn became the artist in residence at the Headlands Center for the Arts.

Kahn moved from San Francisco to Graton, California in 1998 and works from the Ned Kahn Studios in Sebastopol. He is married and has two children. Kahn cites his daily meditation routine as key to his artistic development.

== Awards ==
Often when you ask scientists, 'How did you get into your field?', you find out it was an aesthetic experience. Geologists just love rocks. It's the sensory connection that gets them started.

— Ned Kahn, quoted in 2004 Sunset magazine article

Kahn won a MacArthur Foundation "genius grant" fellowship in 2003, and the National Design Award for landscape architecture in 2005.

== Works ==
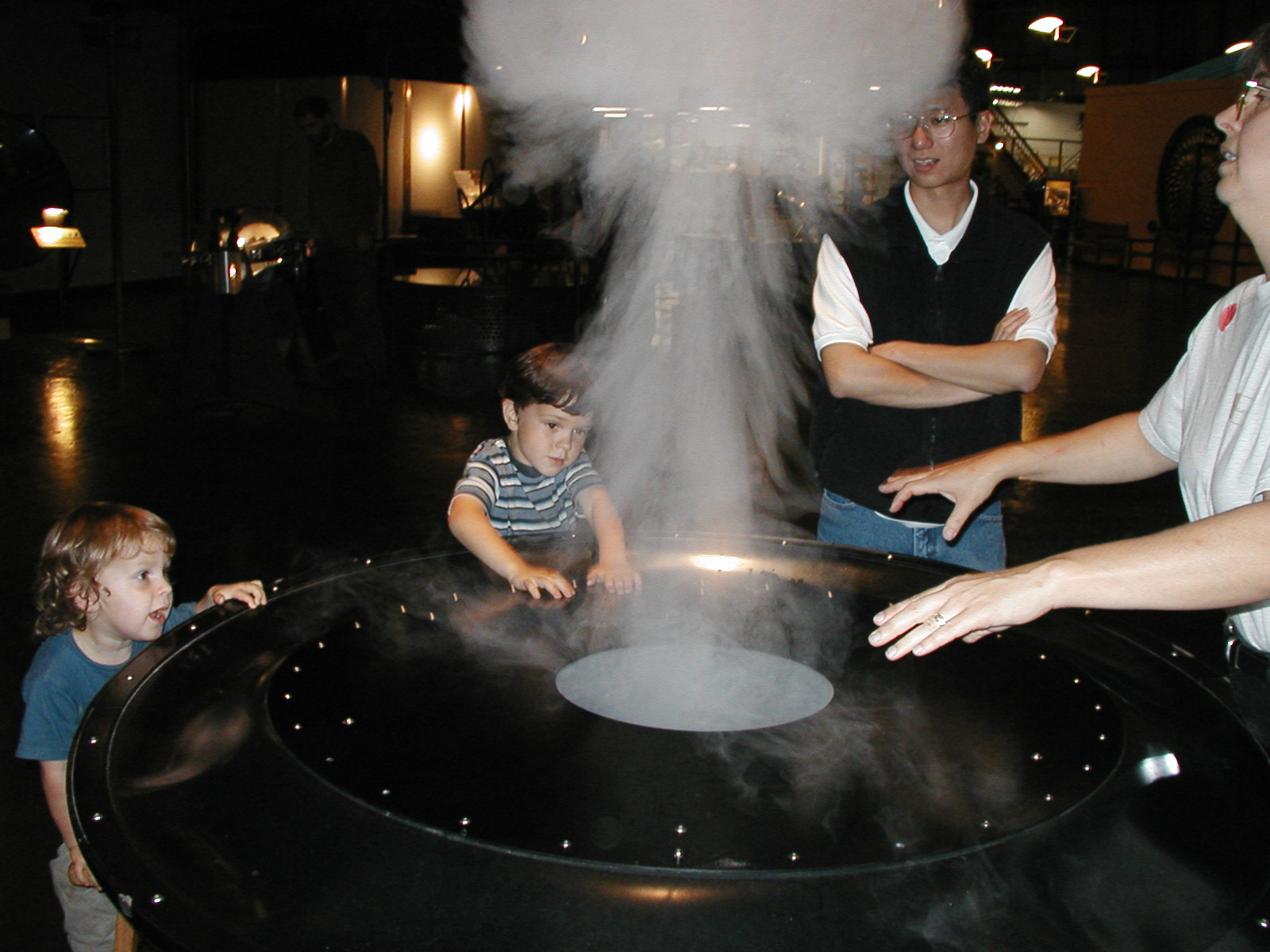
Cloud Rings at the Exploratorium

Some examples of Kahn's work to capture the invisible include building facades that move in waves in response to wind; indoor tornadoes and vortices made of fog, steam, or fire; and a transparent sphere containing water and sand which, when spun, erodes a beach-like ripple pattern into the sand surface. In 2003 Kahn collaborated with Koning Eizenberg Architecture, Inc. on Articulated Cloud, a piece installed on the exterior walls of the Children's Museum of Pittsburgh consisting of hundreds of movable flaps that respond to the wind creating visible patterns.

His work is in the collection of di Rosa, Napa.

Selected works by Ned Kahn
Title	Image	Element	Location	City	State/ Country	Year	Notes	Refs.
Aeolian Landscape		Sand	Museum of Life and Science	Durham	North Carolina	1993	Also on exhibit at the Exploratorium in San Francisco.	
Articulated Cloud		Wind	Children's Museum of Pittsburgh	Pittsburgh	Pennsylvania	2004	Collaboration with Konig/Eizenberg	
Avalanche		Sand	Children's Museum of Pittsburgh	Pittsburgh	Pennsylvania	2011	A similar piece named Negev Wheel has been exhibited at the Contemporary Jewish Museum in San Francisco.	
Braided Stream		Wind	Exploratorium	San Francisco	California			
Breathing Sky		Fog	Yerba Buena Center for the Arts	San Francisco	California	1995		
Bus Jet Fountain		Water	Salesforce Transit Center	San Francisco	California	2018		
Chain of Ether		Wind	ResMed Corporation	San Diego	California	2009		
Chaotic Pendulum			Exploratorium	San Francisco	California			
Circadian Wind	Circa Parking Garage, LA, CA	Wind	Circa Parking Deck	Los Angeles	California	2019		
Circular Wave Umbrella		Wind	Exploratorium	San Francisco	California			
Cloud Arbor		Fog	Buhl Community Park	Pittsburgh	Pennsylvania	2012	Collaboration with Andi Cochran	
Cloud Portal		Fog	Davis Court	San Francisco	California	2011	Collaboration with RHAA	
Cloud Rings		Fog	21c Museum Hotel Louisville	Louisville	Kentucky	2006	An installation with the same name is on exhibit at the Exploratorium in San Francisco.	
Cloud Vessel		Fog	The Docks	Sacramento	California	2010	Collaboration with Walker Macy	
Digitized Field		Wind	AT&T Building	Santa Rosa	California	2004		
Divided Sea		Water	Emerald Glen Park	Dublin	California	2004		
Duales Systems Pavilion		Fog	Expo 2000	Hanover	Germany	2000	Collaboration with Uwe Bruckner	
Enagua		Wind	Playa Vista	Los Angeles	California	2015	Collaboration with Johnson/Fain	
Encircled Cloud		Fog	Paradise Ridge Winery and Sculpture Garden	Santa Rosa	California	2012		
Encircled Stream		Water	Founders Court; Seattle Center	Seattle	Washington	1995	Collaboration with Atelier Landscape Architects	
Encircled Void		Wind	Bertolini Student Center; Santa Rosa Junior College	Santa Rosa	California	2010		
Erratic Fence		Wind	Sonoma County Museum	Santa Rosa	California	2015	Collaboration with Jensen Architects	
Feather Wall		Wind	Robert B. Green Clinical Pavilion	San Antonio	Texas	2012	Collaboration with Overland Partners and RTKL	
Field of Air		Wind	Denver International Airport between Jeppesen Terminal and Westin Hotel	Denver	Colorado	2015	Collaboration with Gensler	
Fire Vortex		Fire/Light	Technorama	Winterthur	Switzerland	1997		
Firefly		Fire/Light	San Francisco Public Utilities Commission; Civic Center	San Francisco	California	2012		
Fluvial Storm		Sand	Exploratorium	San Francisco	California	1990		
Glacial Facade		Fire/Light	Issaquah Highlands Park and Ride	Issaquah	Washington	2006		
Greenhouse Project		Fire/Light	San Francisco County Jail 3	San Bruno	California	1990		
Hidden Sea		Wind	Ceatrice Polite Apartments	San Francisco	California	2000		
Hyperbolic Paraboloid		Wind	Crossroads School	Santa Monica	California	2015	Collaboration with Fred Fisher	
Liquid Pixels		Wind	Rosslyn; 1801 N Lynn St	Arlington	Virginia	2002		
Magnetic Field Stone		Sand	Exploratorium	San Francisco	California	1996		
Mare Undurum		Fire/Light	Tempe Center for the Arts	Tempe	Arizona	2008		
Microturbines		Wind	Santa Rosa Junior College	Santa Rosa	California	2009		
Net of Indra		Fire/Light	Automated Garage at City Hall	West Hollywood	California		Collaboration with Rick D'Amato	
Pebble Chime		Sand	Discovery World; Pier Wisconsin	Milwaukee	Wisconsin	2006		
Pedibrion Falls		Water	21c Museum Hotel Durham	Durham	North Carolina	2015		
Prairie Tree		Wind	Nicollet Mall	Minneapolis	Minnesota	2017		
Prism Tunnel		Fire/Light	Children's Garden; Huntington Library Gardens	San Marino	California	2004		
Project Lions		Wind	Debenhams flagship Oxford Street	London	England	2014	Collaboration with Archial Architects	
Quantum Wave		Water	ATF Headquarters	Washington	District of Columbia	2008		
Rain Oculus		Water	Marina Bay Sands		Singapore	2011	Collaboration with Moshe Safdie	
Rain Portal		Water	San Francisco Public Utilities Commission	San Francisco	California	2012	Deaccessioned in 2018 due to persistent leakage.	
Rainbow Arbor		Fog	Skirball Cultural Center	Los Angeles	California	2008	Collaboration with Moshe Safdie	
Rift Zone		Sand	Exploratorium	San Francisco	California			
Seismic Sea		Water	Pasadena Museum of California Art	Pasadena	California	2009		
Sonic Pool		Water	Children's Garden; Huntington Library Gardens	San Marino	California	2004		
Sonic Range		Sand	Exploratorium	San Francisco	California	1992		
Spoonfall		Water	H2 Hotel	Healdsburg	California	2010		
Subducted Landscapes		Sand	Chevron Texaco Headquarters	San Ramon	California	2002		
Technorama Facade		Wind	Technorama; The Swiss Science Center	Winterthur	Switzerland	2002		
Tipping Wall		Water	Marina Bay Sands		Singapore	2011	Collaboration with Moshe Safdie	
Tornado		Fog	World Financial Center; Battery Park City	New York	New York	1990	Also on exhibit at the Exploratorium in San Francisco.	
Turbulent Line		Wind	Brisbane Airport	Brisbane	Australia	2012	Collaboration with UAP	
Turbulent Orb		Water	World Financial Center; Battery Park City	New York	New York	1990	Also on exhibit at the Exploratorium in San Francisco.	
Turbulent Shade		Wind	City Hall	Chandler	Arizona	2010		
Vertical Canal		Wind	Rijkswaterstaat	Utrecht	Netherlands	2008		
The Wave		Wind	Target Field	Minneapolis	Minnesota	2010	Collaboration with Tom Oslund and Associates	
Wave Oculus		Water	Union Point Pier	Oakland	California	2006		
Wavespout (Breathing Sea)		Water	Ventura Pier	San Buenaventura	California	1993	Destroyed by 1995 storm along with 420 feet (130 m) of the Pier	
Wind Arbor		Wind	Marina Bay Sands		Singapore	2011	Collaboration with Moshe Safdie	
Wind Cube		Wind	[private collection]	Santa Rosa	California	2005		
Wind Fence		Wind	University of Oregon	Eugene	Oregon			
Wind Fingers		Wind	[private collection]	Sebastopol	California			
Wind Fins		Wind	Neiman Marcus	Walnut Creek	California	2012		
Wind House		Wind	DiRosa Art and Nature Preserve	Napa	California	2003		
Wind Leaves		Wind	Discovery World; Pier Wisconsin	Milwaukee	Wisconsin	2006		
Wind Portal		Wind	San Francisco International Airport station	San Francisco	California	2003		
Wind Roundabout		Wind	Traffic roundabout	Fort Worth	Texas	2015		
Wind Silos		Wind	International Trade Center	Charlotte	North Carolina	2006		
Wind Veil		Wind	Gateway Village	Charlotte	North Carolina	2000		

== See also ==
- Environmental art
- Environmental sculpture
