= Topsail =

Sail set above another sail

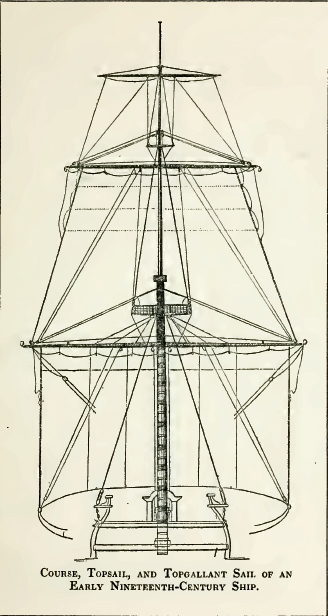

A topsail ("tops'l") is a sail set above another sail. On square-rigged vessels further sails may be set above topsails. Except when pole masts are used, a topsail takes its name from the mast on which it is set: the top-mast.

== Square rig ==
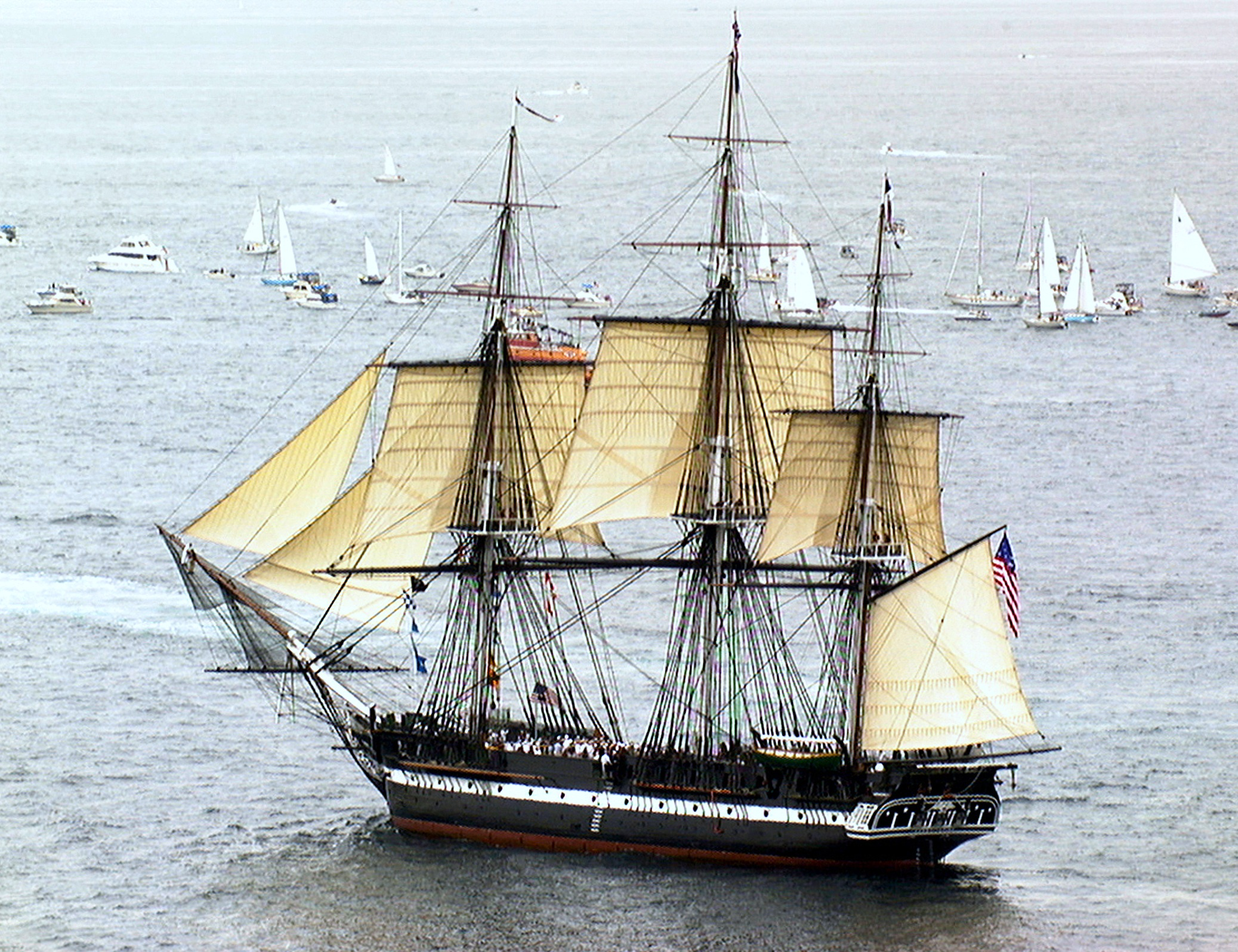
USS Constitution sailing under (bow to stern) jibs, topsails, and spanker.

On a square rigged vessel, a topsail is a typically trapezoidal shaped sail rigged above the course sail and below the topgallant sail where carried, on any mast (i.e., a fully rigged ship would have a fore-topsail, a main-topsail, and a mizzen-topsail). A full rigged ship will have either single or double (i.e., "split" upper and lower) topsails on any mast, the single or lower topsail being the second sail above the deck and the upper topsail where so rigged being the third.

Although described as a "square" sail, a topsail on a full rigged ship refers not to the sail's shape but to it and its yard being rigged square (i.e., at a right angle) to the vessel's keel rather than in line with it (in which case it would be called a fore-and-aft rig or a fore-and-aft rigged sail); a square rigged topsail is nearly always trapezoidal in shape, with the lengths of the upper yards being progressively smaller the higher they are on the mast. The bottom edge of the topsail, like that of other square rigged sails, is slightly concave which allows the rigging to connect to the mast. The principal exception to this trapezoidal rule is the raffee sail, which is a square rigged topsail that is triangular (such as is seen on the foremast of the ship Denis Sullivan, a topsail schooner). A topsail which is fore-and-aft rigged is usually also triangular, but has its longest edge oriented vertically rather than horizontally as seen in the raffee sail.

Although the early Romans used a sort of fore-and-aft rigged topsail on some vessels, this sail came into prominent use in Europe some time in the 15th century. Initially small and carried only on main and fore masts, they gradually increased in size and importance until by the middle of the 17th century and were the principal and largest sails of the ship, the first sails to be set and the last to be taken in. It was quite common for a ship to sail with topsails and jibs alone; the position of the topsails well above the sea ensured that they received a steady breeze even if the seas were rough.

Because of their ability to drive a ship in lighter winds than the course sail below or any sail above, the topsail quickly became enormous and was soon difficult and dangerous to handle in strong winds. Sometime in the 1680s, reef-bands were introduced to tie up part of the sail, with topsails eventually getting four of these. In the mid 19th century topsails of merchant vessels were split into separate upper and lower topsails that could be managed independently and far more easily by significantly smaller crews (see Cutty Sark for a prominent example). Such sails were still often referred to as a single "topsail", however.

Competing versions of this double topsail were invented by Robert Bennet Forbes and Captain Frederic Howes. Although Forbes strove to defend his rig, the Howe rig dominated. In the Forbes rig, both topsail yards are fixed vertically. In the Howe rig, the upper topsail yard slides on the topmast so it can be lowered in a few seconds to close reef the upper topsail. Howe had the foot of the upper topsail closely attached to the lower topsail yard. In 1865 the British clipper Ariel introduced a gap there. Forbes first tried his rig in the topsail schooner Midas in 1844.The clipper Climax built in 1853 under the supervision of Howes was the first ship with Howe rig.

== Gaff rig ==
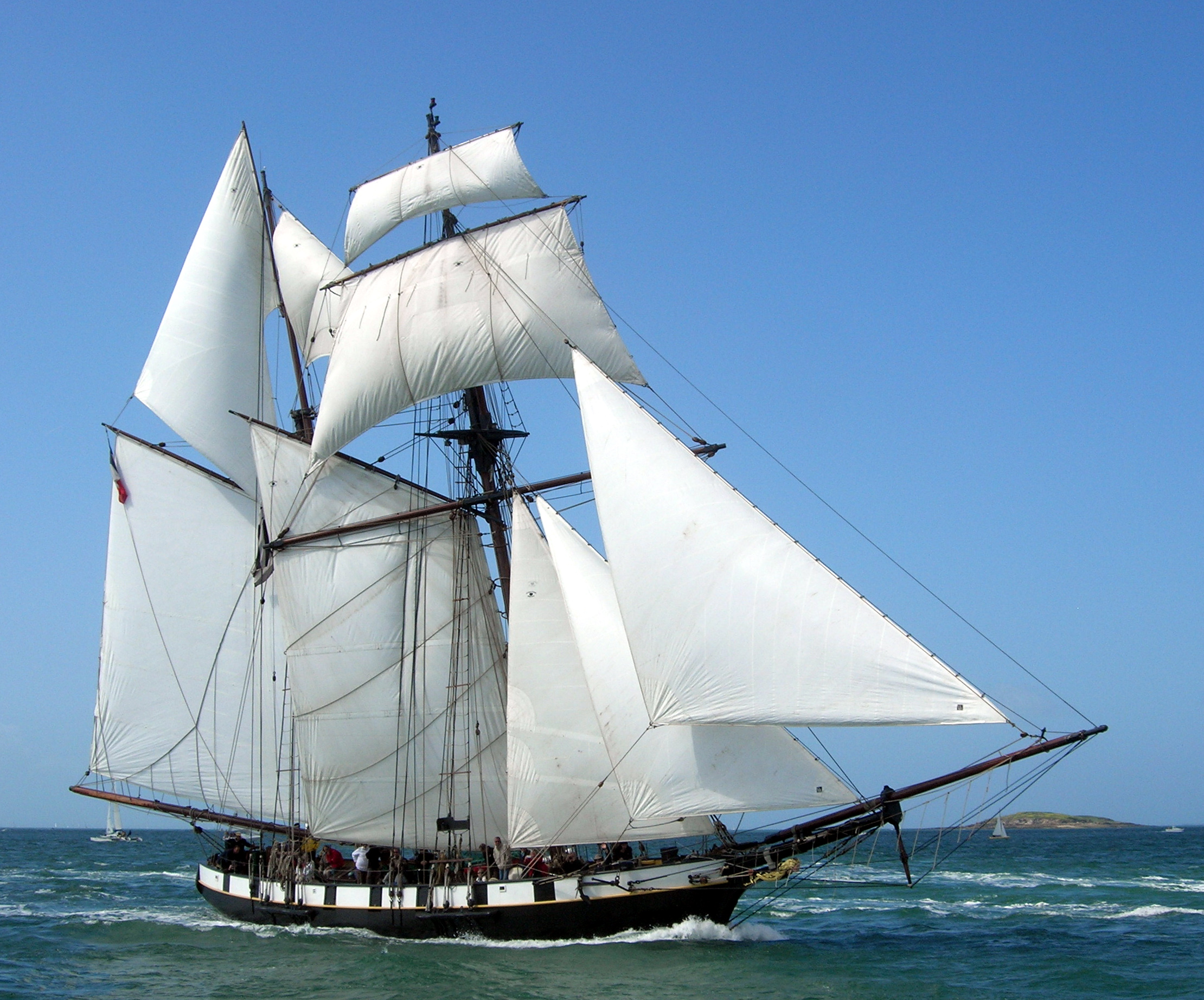
La Recouvrance with both a gaff topsail (set on the mainmast) and a square topsail on the foremast (above which is a topgallant); the partly obscured sail between the topmasts is a topmast staysail

On a gaff-rigged sailing vessel, topsails have several different forms:

- A jib-headed topsail is generally a triangular sail set between the gaff and the top of the mast or topmast. A gaff-rigged vessel might have a gaff topsail above any or all of its gaff sails.
- A yard topsail is similar, but set on a yard. Early 19th-century topsail yards were set almost horizontally, but gradually increased in angle until they became almost vertical extension of the topmast.
- A jack-yard topsail (or club topsail) instead has its lower edge (or foot) extended out beyond the end of the gaff with a short yard, called a "jack-yard". A jack-yard topsail may also have the aforementioned vertical yard, although this makes for a very large topsail.
- A cornish topsail is a triangular sail having its luff extended well above the masthead by being laced to a yard hoisted by a halyard that is rove through a sheave fitted diagonally in the mast. The heel of the yard fits immediately about the gaff and is kept in place by a tackline called a timminoggy.
- A square topsail is a square-rigged sail carried above the foresail only on gaff schooners. (A brigantine is an example of a two-masted vessel with a forward course.) Schooners carrying square tops are referred to as "topsail schooners"; gaff topsails are taken for granted on gaff-rigged vessels and pass without comment in a vessel description.

== Other fore-and-aft topsails ==
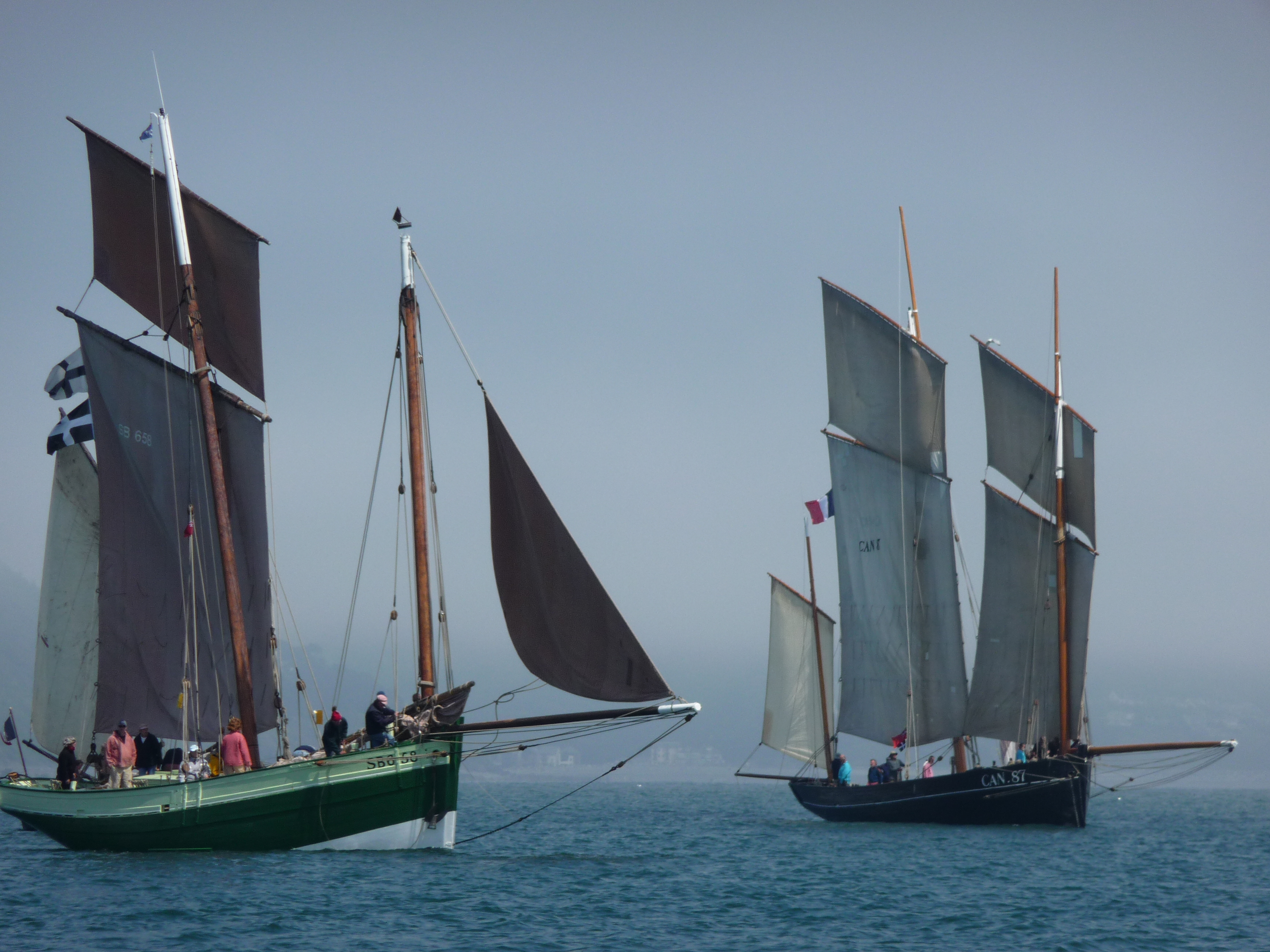
Luggers with lug topsails set

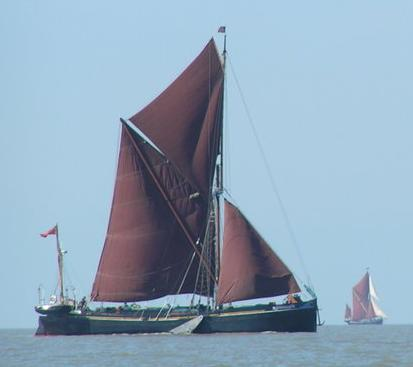
Spritsail rig on a Thames barge, with a topsail set, sheeted out to the end of the sprit.

Topsails are also found on other fore-and-aft rigs: the spritsail and lug rig. The lug topsail is, in simple terms, a smaller version of the sail set beneath it. This arrangement was particularly common on French luggers; a British example is the Walmer lugger in the middle of the nineteenth century.

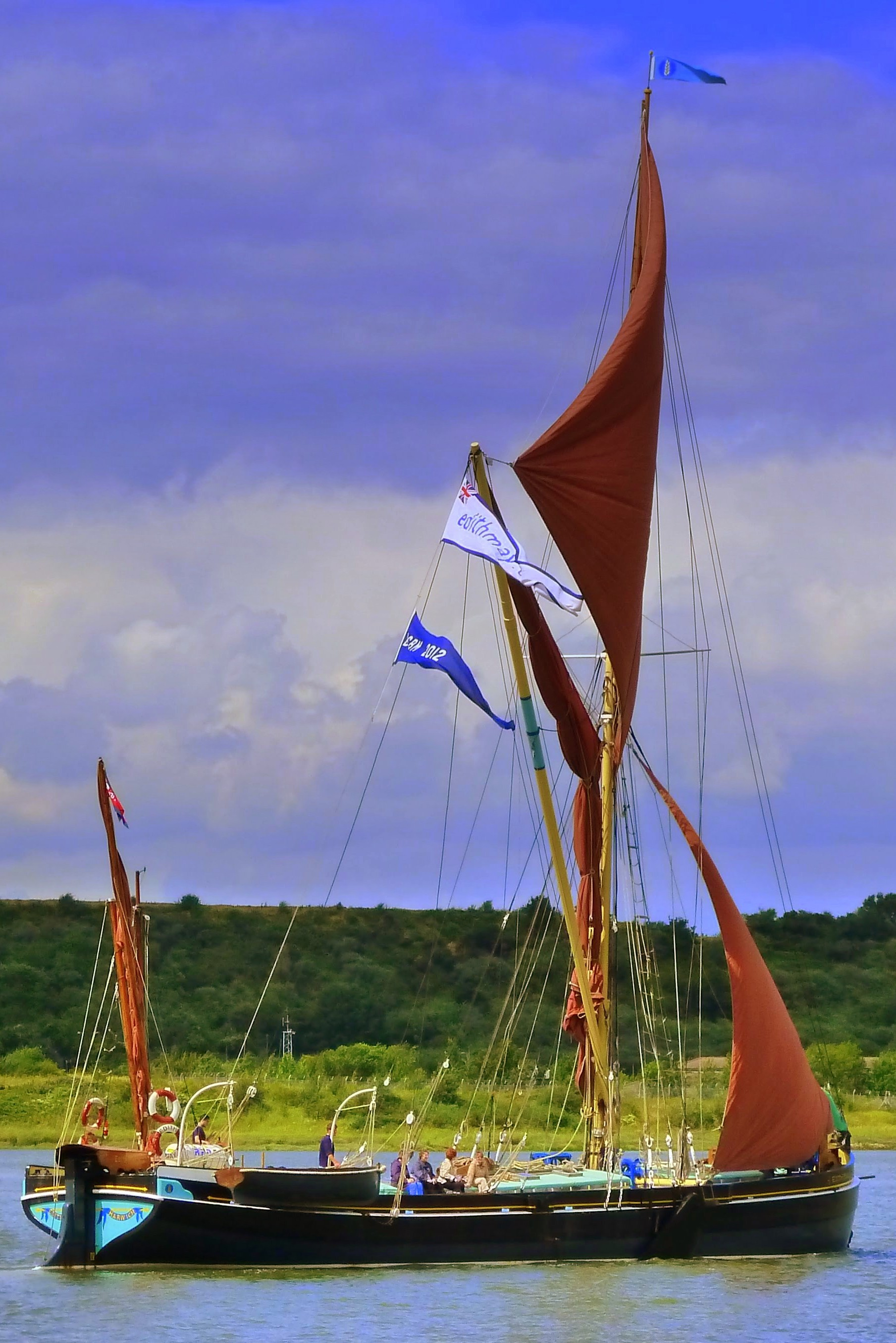
A Thames barge sailing under topsail and jib

The topsail on a spritsail-rigged mast is broadly similar to that in a gaff rig. It has an approximately triangular shape, with the head hoisted by a halyard, with a tack downhaul tackle to tension the luff. The clew is sheeted to the end of the sprit. In a Thames Barge, the luff is seized to mast hoops which run up and down the topmast. The topsail can be handed by letting go the halyard and pulling the clew in to the mast with a clewline. The luff is extended with a short jack-yard. An important characteristic of the topsail on a Thames Barge is that it does not require the sail underneath it to be set first. Therefore, a barge working along a river can sail with just the topsail set, catching wind that is not blanketed by buildings or trees along the river and having better visibility across the deck to avoid other traffic.

== Other uses ==
On rigs having multiple jibs or staysails of which at least one is set high, such as many late 19th and 20th Century racing cutters, the uppermost of these, set flying or on a topmast stay, is often called the jib topsail.

== Roman navigation ==
Topsails (Greek: sipharos; Latin: siparum) in the form of an isosceles triangle set above the square mainsail were used in Roman navigation.
