= Wind Fence =

Sculpture in Eugene, Oregon, U.S.

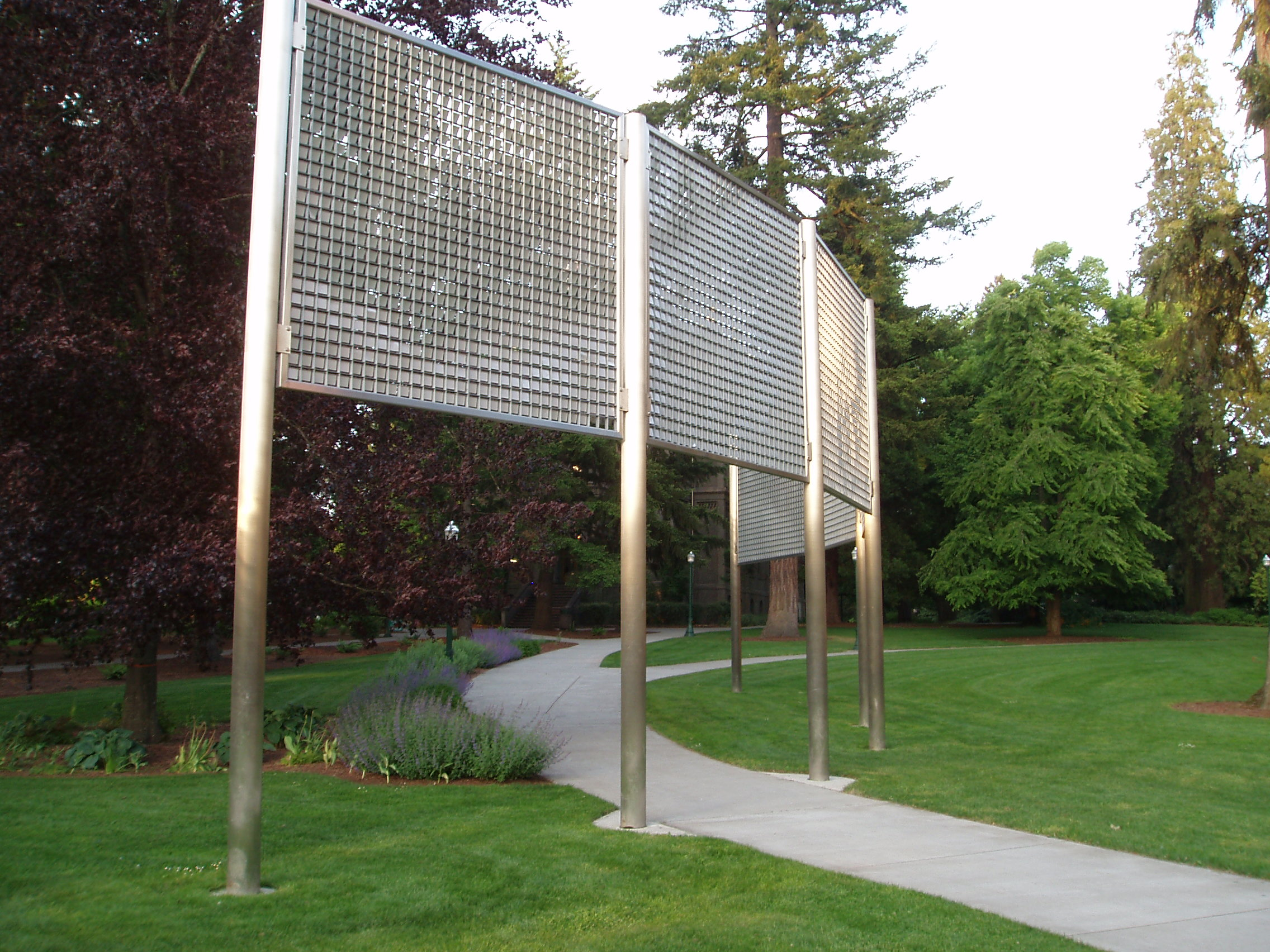
- The sculpture in 2007
- Artist: Ned Kahn
- Type: Sculpture
- Medium: Aluminum
- Location: Eugene, Oregon, United States; 44.04638°N 123.07742°W

Wind Fence is an outdoor sculpture by Ned Kahn, installed on the north side of the Lillis Business Complex on the University of Oregon campus in Eugene, Oregon, United States. It is composed of panels of small aluminum flaps, suspended in the air, which are allowed to freely move in the wind. The design reveals the invisible passage of wind through the fence. It was funded by the State of Oregon as part of the statewide Percent for Art program.
