= Topgallant sail =

Type of sail on a square rigged vessel

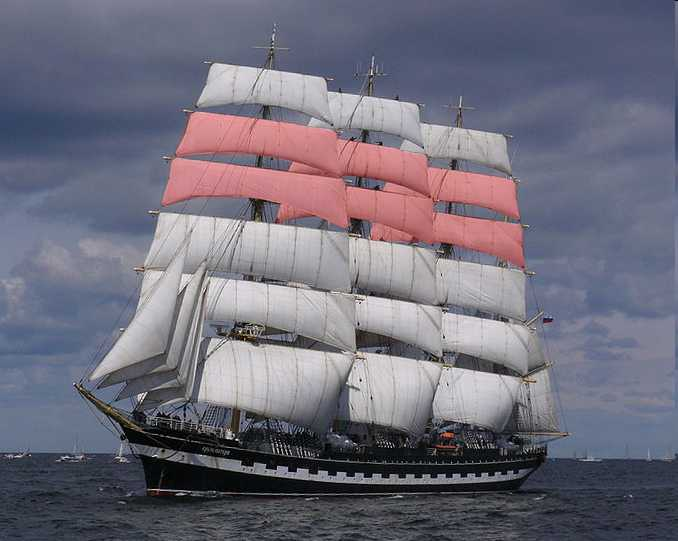
Topgallant sails in pink

On a square rigged sailing vessel, a topgallant sail (topgallant alone pronounced "t'gallant", topgallant sail pronounced "t'garns'l") is the square-rigged sail or sails immediately above the topsail or topsails. It is also known as a gallant or garrant sail.

Later full-rigged ships split the topsail (and often the topgallant sail) for easier handling. They thus set two topsails (and possibly two topgallant sails) per mast. The lower topgallant sail is immediately above the upper topsail. The upper or only topgallant sail is set from the top of the topgallant mast. If there is a lower topgallant it is set from midway down the topgallant mast. A staysail set on a stay running forward and downwards from the top or midpoint of the topgallant mast is called a topgallant staysail.
