= Discovery World (museum) =

STEM museum in Milwaukee, Wisconsin, US

Coordinates: 43.036818°N 87.896045°W

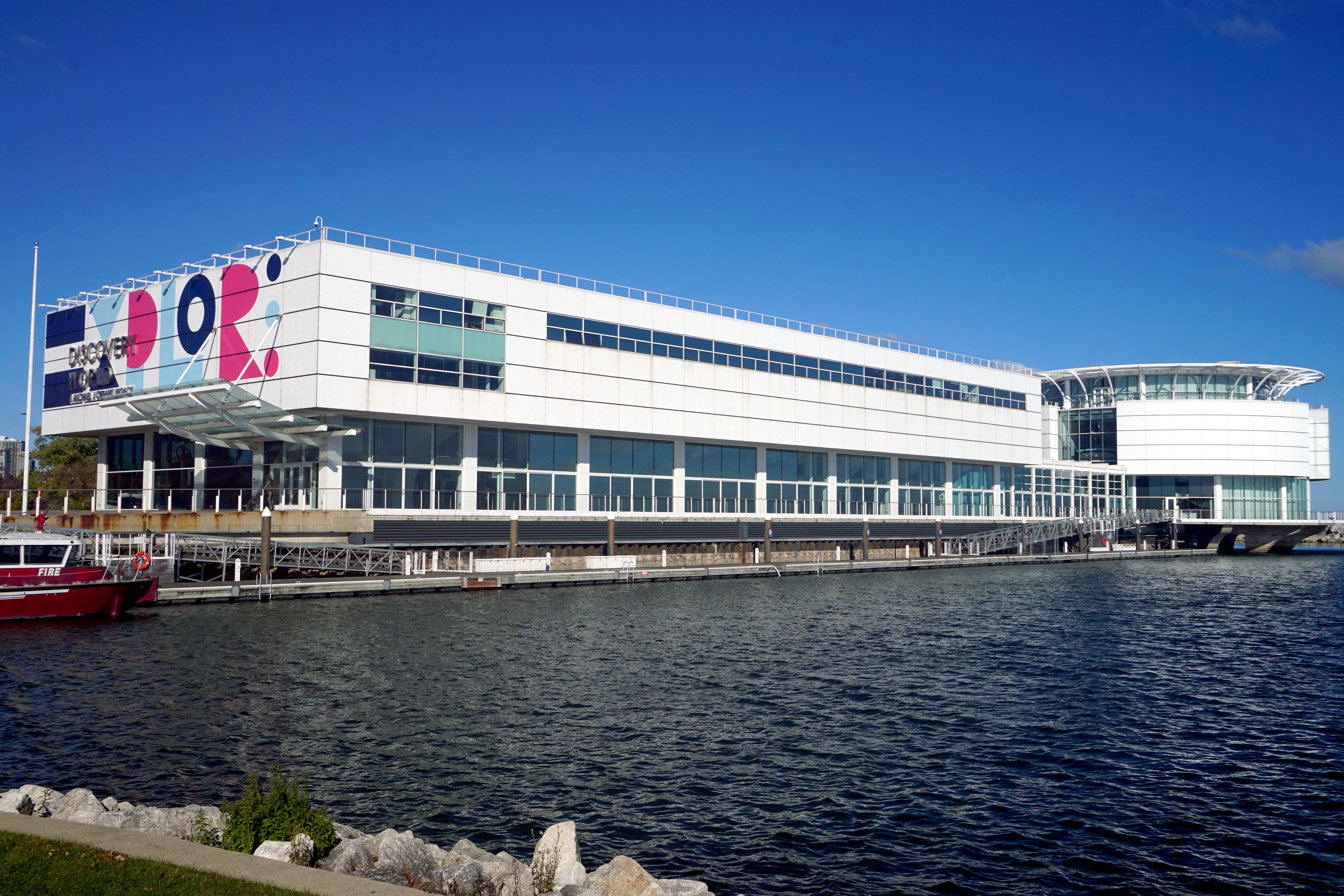
- Discovery World on the Lake Michigan shore in Milwaukee
- CEO: John Emmerich
- Website: discoveryworld.org

Discovery World is a science and technology museum in Milwaukee, Wisconsin. Discovery World is a 501(c)(3) non-profit organization that does not receive any public funding.

== History ==
Founded by Robert Powrie Harland, Sr., Discovery World was initially known as the Science, Economics and Technology Center. Plans for it appeared in the Milwaukee Journal in 1981. The museum's early location was the Milwaukee Public Library, inside the Wisconsin Ave. entrance of the library. The museum featured hands-on exhibits, computerized simulations, and science shows.

In 1995, they moved again and shared a building with the Milwaukee Public Museum. Under the guidance of local philanthropist and tinkerer Michael Cudahy, in 2006 he and others built the museum's current home on Lake Michigan’s shoreline.

Discovery World was the former owner and caretaker of the replica 19th century Great Lakes schooner Denis Sullivan, the flagship of the state of Wisconsin. After financial and maintenance concerns following the COVID-19 pandemic, Discovery World controversially sold the ship to World Ocean School in Boston, Massachusetts, in 2022, a sale that received much criticism from the original builders and organizers of the ship as well as the wider Milwaukee community.

== Exhibits ==
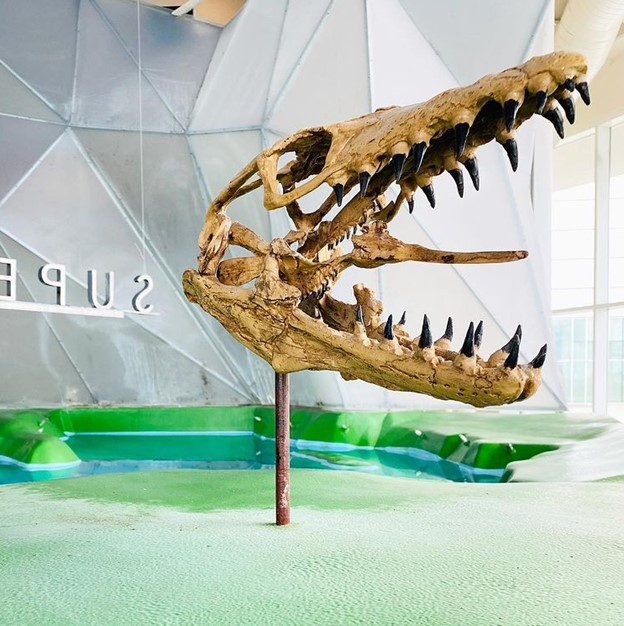
A Mosasaur skull within the larger Great Lakes Future exhibit

Discovery World contains numerous interactive science, technology, and freshwater exhibits in its 140,000-square-foot (13,000 m^{2}) facility. These exhibits include the following:

=== Great Lakes future ===
A model of the entire Great Lakes watershed built to scale addresses freshwater issues, stewardship, and the relationship between humans and freshwater resources. It also features an artificially induced weather event. With the push of a button, visitors can call for "rain" to fall down upon this watershed, observing where the water flows and how run-off pollutants navigate the region. The perimeter of the exhibit features several tank habitats. Inhabitants include a northern spiny softshell turtle, an ornate box turtle, a three-toed box turtle, a Blanding's turtle, North American wood turtles, a corn snake, pumpkinseed, and bluegill. Several ice-age and prehistoric animal skulls are found throughout the exhibit as well. The permanent exhibit was designed by Grace La and James Dallman of LA DALLMAN and was published in the Berlin monograph 1000x Architecture of the Americas.

=== Reiman Aquarium ===
The Reiman Aquarium is the largest aquarium in the state of Wisconsin and occupies the lower level of Discovery World. Tank exhibits replicate a wide variety of aquatic habitats, including that of Lake Michigan, the Pacific and Atlantic Oceans, the Caribbean Sea, and much more.

Notable features include a 75,000-gallon Lake Michigan tank, 65,000-gallon Caribbean tunnel tank, and multiple touch tanks. The Lake Michigan tank at the center of the aquarium is home to Lake Sturgeon and many other species native to the Great Lakes. The 65,000-gallon warm saltwater tank is the most colorful and active tank. It is constructed as an upside-down halfpipe, which visitors can walk through. This tank is home to a rooster hogfish, a sargassum triggerfish, bamboo sharks, goatfish, French and Queen angelfish, a cownose stingray, and a variety of grunts, a scrawled tilefish.

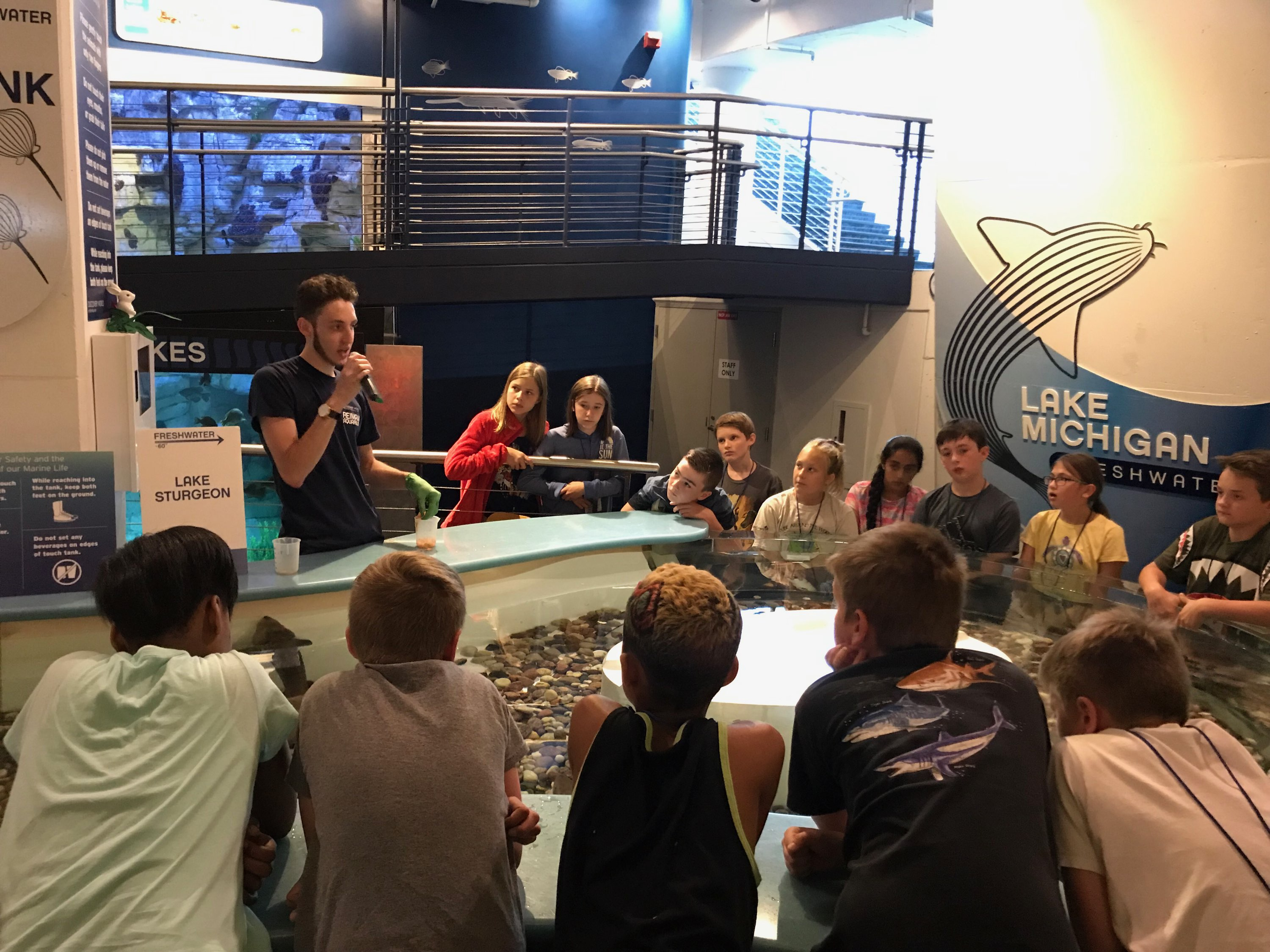
Aquarium intern gives "touch tank Talk'" on freshwater Lake Sturgeon.

==== Touch tanks ====
There are multiple touch tanks where visitors can have a hands-on interaction with unique aquatic creatures.

A cold freshwater touch tank features young lake sturgeon. A much warmer saltwater touch tank features Atlantic stingray and Cortez round stingray. Additionally, an invertebrate tank which is home to Slipper Lobsters.

=== Les Paul’s House of Sound ===
Les Paul's House of Sound features three different areas: Les's Early Years, The Musician on the Road to Stardom, and Friends of Les Paul. The exhibit includes Paul’s Grammy Awards, the first Gibson guitar Paul produced, and the "Klunker" he used.

=== City of freshwater & liquid house ===
This exhibit explains how the water used in homes eventually flows back to Lake Michigan. Other features of this exhibit include a look into Milwaukee Metropolitan Sewerage District processes, Milwaukee Water Works, and Milwaukee’s Deep Tunnel project, which reduces the amount of wastewater dumped into Lake Michigan each year. The permanent exhibit, comprising more than twenty interactive installations, was designed by Grace La and James Dallman of LA DALLMAN.

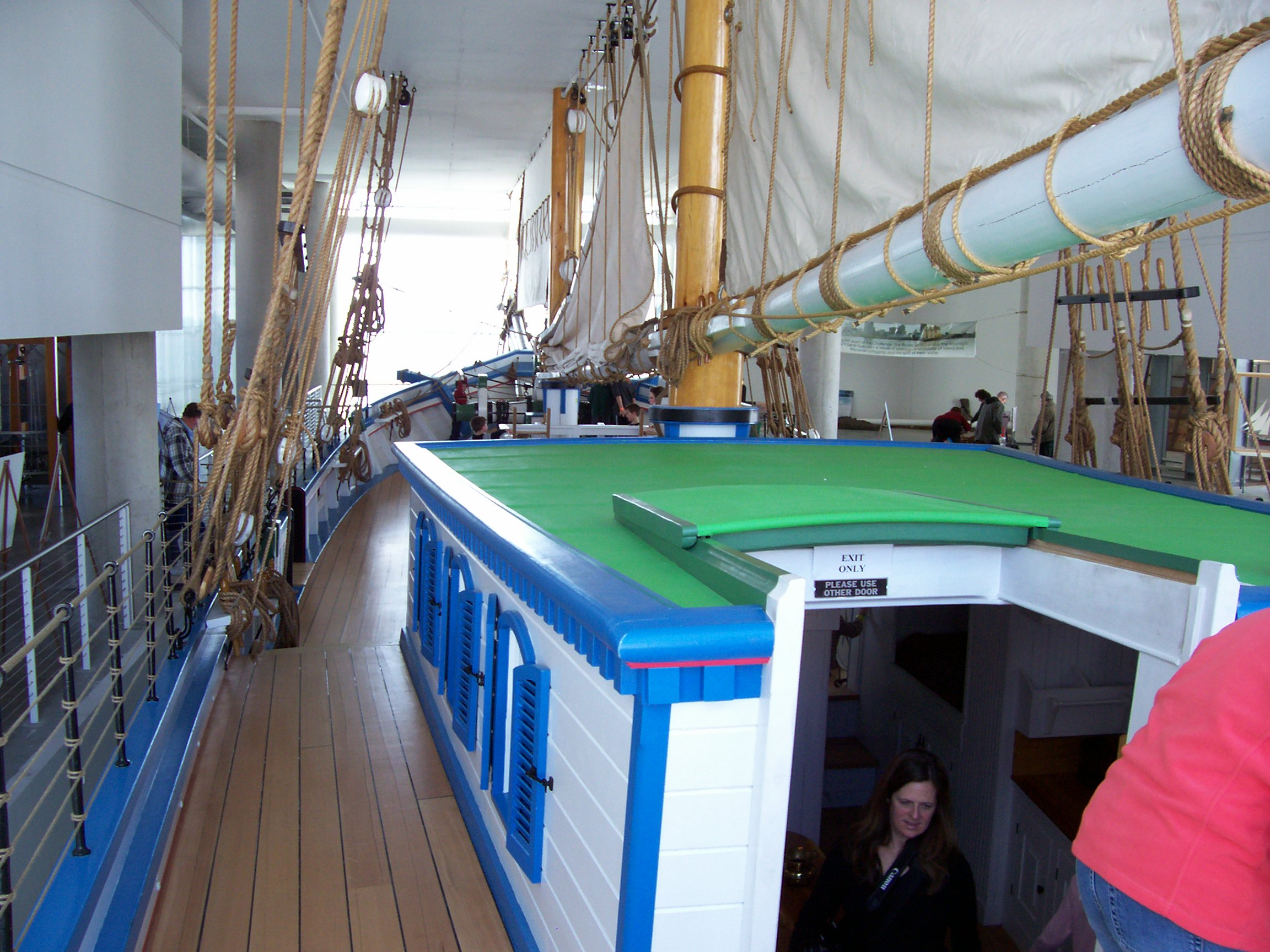
88-foot replica of the Challenge, a mid-1800s Great Lakes freight schooner

=== Automation everywhere ===
This exhibit includes a focus on artificial intelligence, mechanics, and engineering. The Dream Machine allows the public to design products to take home, experience a custom-built automated factory, and learn modern engineering trends. Visitors can operate the controls of the retractable domes of Miller Park and the Milwaukee Art Museum.

=== Other exhibits ===
Other exhibits at Discovery World include The Challenge (an 88 ft replica of a 19th-century schooner), Simple Machines, Driving and Flight Simulators, All Aboard, Milwaukee Muscle, Power On, Physics and You, Exploration Station, Virtual Explorer, Magic Mirror, Doodle Studio, and Automation Everywhere.

== Experiences ==
Discovery World offers:

- Design It! Lab is a weekend experience of a maker space that offers hands-on projects for all ages.
- Virtual Explorer is a virtual reality experience featuring immersive gameplay and impossible environments.
- Wind Leaves is a permanent group of sculptures in front of Discovery World. It consists of seven tall "leaves" coated in stainless steel disks that reflect the surroundings and react to wind. They are interactive and can be spun by visitors.

== Labs and studios ==
Discovery World has ten educational spaces, that provide opportunities for visitors, school groups, and campers to participate in hands-on experiences focused on creativity, science, technology, and freshwater, especially the Great Lakes. These ten spaces include:

- STEM Lab – provides a panoramic backdrop for exploring STEM topics from cells to chemistry to circuits.
- Design It! Lab – a making space that explores architecture, engineering, and design through hands-on projects. This space is open on weekends for guests to participate in a rotating menu of design projects.
- Automation Lab – focused on circuits, robotics, coding, and programming, the Automation Lab lets participants explore and understand the technology behind automation.
- SPARK Lab – an adaptable room that allows more space for exploring topics covered in other learning spaces.
- Curiosity Works Lab – a space to inspire exploration and self-expression. Participants can explore color and design, and use printing technology, from letter press to screen printing.
- Tech Lab – supports programming based on digital arts, such as photography, videography, and video game design.
- The Studio – a multifunction production space with a full chromakey wall and professional lighting.
- Health Sciences Lab – a hands-on space focused on anatomy, dissections, and micro-organisms.
- THIRST Lab - a space designed to explore water’s role in the products we use and consume. Participants explore senses and perception, as well as the processes involved in creating products such as fragrances and soaps.
- Freshwater Sustainability Lab – focused on Lake Michigan and fresh water as a resource, the Freshwater Sustainability Lab provides experiences on water quality, invasive species, and freshwater organisms.
