= Wind Leaves (Kahn) =

Artwork by Ned Kahn

- Artist: Ned Kahn
- Year: 2006
- Type: Aluminum and stainless steel sculpture
- Dimensions: 9.1 m (30 ft)
- Location: E. Michigan St. and N. Harbor Dr., Milwaukee; 43°2′13.216″N 87°53′51.619″W

Wind Leaves is a public artwork by American artist Ned Kahn located on the downtown lakefront Pier Wisconsin in Milwaukee, Wisconsin, United States. It was created in 2006 and consists of a series of seven 30 ft (9 m) tall structures made from aluminum and stainless steel. The structures, which move with the wind, have leaf forms at the top covered by thousands of stainless steel disks.

== Description ==
The seven 30 ft (9 m) structures that make up Wind Leaves each have a semi-circular form at the top which is covered by stainless steel disks. This provides a sparkling surface that reflects its surroundings such as the lakefront, city traffic at night, and the sunset. There are hand wheels on the support columns that allow the viewers to interact with the sculpture by turning it. Wind Leaves also has ball bearings in the columns that cause the work to move with the wind. The artwork has a musical component as well. There are a group of benches with drum sticks around the columns that can be played like xylophones, and there is a musical instrument that can be played by dropping pebbles into it.

== Historical information ==
Wind Leaves is an environmental sculpture currently located in front of Discovery World at Milwaukee's Pier Wisconsin. The piece was paid for by an anonymous donor, and was originally designed to be placed near a grove of trees in Veteran's Park, an area north of its current location. Kahn envisioned the sculpture as a "forest of vertical elements" paying tribute to Milwaukee's big trees. Once the donor asked for the location to be changed closer to the water, the design concept changed to reflect its new surroundings. Kahn thus envisioned the present work, which is meant to "create the impression of being surrounded by a field of wind." "This sculpture works on many levels. First, it can be seen from a far, sparkling against the lake and the new museum's white geometry. It draws us to it. Up close, the experience is powerful but not obtrusive. You can sit in the park and relax, while at the same time enjoy the movement of the shapes as the wind pushes them around."

=== Acquisition ===
The money for the sculpture ($500,000) was provided by an anonymous donor.

== See also ==
- Environmental art
