= Raffee sail =

Type of ship sail

A raffee sail is a triangular topsail carried aboard certain sailing ships. Originally used in ancient Rome to maneuver ships at sea, the raffee was eventually implemented as a downwind sail set below a square-rigged yard to fill in areas needed for light airs. In later pilot schooners, it was a triangular sail set above a yard from the masthead. Today a "raffee" is any square downwind sail set off the mast at a right angle.
