= Outline of sailing =

Overview of and topical guide to sailing

The following outline is provided as an overview of and topical guide to sailing:

Sailing – the use of wind to provide the primary power via sail(s) or wing to propel a craft over water, ice or land. A sailor manages the force of the wind on the sails by adjusting their angle with respect to the moving sailing craft and sometimes by adjusting the sail area.

== Overview ==
Sailing can be described as all of the following:

- Exercise – bodily activity that enhances or maintains physical fitness and overall health or wellness.
- Recreation – activity of leisure, leisure being discretionary time.
  - Outdoor recreation –
- Sport – organized, competitive, entertaining, and skillful physical activity requiring commitment, strategy, and fair play, in which a winner can be defined by objective means.
- Transport – movement of people and goods from one location to another.
  - Boating – travel or transport by boat; or the recreational use of a boat (whether powerboats, sailboats, or man-powered vessels such as rowing and paddle boats) focused on the travel itself or on sports activities, such as fishing.
  - Travel – movement of people between relatively distant geographical locations for any purpose and any duration, with or without any additional means of transport.
  - Tourism – travel for recreational, leisure or business purposes.

== Types of sailing ==
- Canoe sailing
- Cruising (maritime)
- Dinghy sailing
- Sailing (sport)
  - Dinghy racing
  - Match racing
  - Fleet racing
  - Team racing
  - Speed sailing
- Single-handed sailing
- Yachting

== History of sailing ==
History of sailing

- Age of Sail

== Types of sailing vessels ==
- Sailboat
  - Catboat
  - Cutter (boat)
  - Day sailer
  - Dinghy
  - Skiff (sailing)
  - Keelboat
  - Ketch
  - Pleasure craft
  - Sailing hydrofoil
  - Sailing yacht (small)
  - Sloop
  - Yawl
- Sailing ship
  - Bermuda sloop
  - Clipper
    - Medium clipper
    - Extreme clipper
    - Dutch clipper
  - Junk (ship)
  - Ketch
  - Sailing yacht (large)
  - Schooner
  - Sportsboat
  - Tall ship

== Parts of a sailing vessel ==
- Aftercastle
- Anchor
- Anchor windlass
- Beakhead
- Bilge
- Bilgeboard
- Boom brake
- Bow
- Bowsprit
- Capstan
- Cathead
- Centreboard
- Chains
- Cockpit
- Crow's nest
- Daggerboard
- Deck
- Figurehead
- Forecastle
- Gangway
- Gunwale
- Head
- Hull
- Jackline
- Jibboom
- Keel
- Keel (Canting)
- Kelson
- Leeboard
- Mast
- Orlop deck
- Poop deck
- Prow
- Quarter gallery
- Quarterdeck
- Rudder
- Sail
- Ship's wheel
- Skeg
- Spar (sailing)
- Stem
- Stern
- Sternpost
- Strake
- Tiller
- Top
- Transom
- Whipstaff
- Wind transducer
- Winch

=== Hull configurations ===
- Monohull
- Multihull
  - Catamaran
  - Trimaran

=== Rigging ===
Rigging – apparatus through which the force of the wind is used to propel sailboats and sailing ships forward. This includes spars (masts, yards, etc.), sails, and cordage.

==== Types of rigs ====
- Bermuda rig
- Cat rig
- Crab claw sail
- Fore-and-aft rig
- Full rig
- Fractional rig
- Gaff rig
- Junk rig
- Lateen
- Ljungstrom rig
- Mast aft rig
- Spritsail
- Square rig

==== Rigging components ====
- Standing rigging – the fixed lines, wires, or rods, which support each mast or bowsprit on a sailing vessel and reinforce those spars against wind loads transferred from the sails.
  - Backstay
  - Bobstay
  - Chainplates
  - Forestay
  - Ratlines
  - Shroud
  - Stay mouse
  - Stays
  - Turnbuckle
- Running rigging – the components used for raising, lowering, shaping and controlling the sails on a sailing vessel
  - Block
  - Boomkicker
  - Braces
  - Buntlines
  - Cleat
  - Clewlines
  - Cunningham
  - Downhaul
  - Earing
  - Fairlead
  - Gasket
  - Gooseneck
  - Gunter rig
  - Guy
  - Halyard
    - Peak
    - Throat
  - Kicker
  - Lazy jack
  - Outhaul
  - Parrel beads
  - Preventer
  - Spinnaker chute
  - Sheet
  - Topping lift
  - Trapeze
  - Traveller
  - Vang
- General rigging components
  - Clevis pin
  - Deadeye
  - Shackle
  - Windex

===== Types of Spars =====
Spar (sailing) – pole of wood, metal or lightweight materials such as carbon fibre used in the rigging of a sailing vessel to carry or support its sail. These include booms and masts, which serve both to deploy sail and resist compressive and bending forces, as well as the bowsprit and spinnaker pole.

- Boom
- Bowsprit
- Boomkin
- Dolphin striker a/k/a Martingale
- Pelican striker
- Fore-mast
- Gaff
- Jackstaff
- Jibboom
- Jigger-mast
- Jury rigging
- Main-mast
- Mast
- Mizzen-mast
- Truck
- Spinnaker pole
- Spreader
- Sprit
- Topmast
- Yard

===== Sails =====
- Sail a device designed to receive and redirect a force upon a surface area. Traditionally, the surface was engineered of woven fabric and supported by a mast, whose purpose is to propel a sailing vessel.

====== Types of sails ======
- Blooper
- Course
- Crab claw
- Driver
- Extra
- Fisherman
- Junk sail
- Lateen
- Lug sail
- Mainsail
- Moonraker
- Parafoil
- Ringtail
- Rotorsail
- Royal
- Screecher
- Skysail
- Spanker
- Spinnaker
  - Asymmetrical spinnaker
    - Gennaker
- Spritsail
- Staysail
  - Jib
  - Genoa
- Studding
- Topgallant
- Topsail
- Trysail
- Turbosail
- Watersail
- Wingsail

====== Sail anatomy ======
- Sail material
  - Dacron
  - Technora
  - Kevlar
  - Twaron
- Parts of a sail
  - Clew
  - Foot
  - Head
  - Leech
  - Luff
  - Roach
  - Tack
  - Throat
  - Peak

== Sailing vessel design and physics ==
- Sail-plan
- Racing Rules of Sailing
- Forces on sails

=== Stability of sailing vessels ===
- Turtling (sailing)
- Angle of loll
- Broach (nautical)
- Death roll
- Drogue
- Limit of positive stability
- Metacentric height
- Naval architecture
- Ship stability
- Weight distribution

== Sailing activity ==
- Five essentials of sailing
- Sail training

=== Sport sailing ===
Sailing (sport) – using sailboats for sporting purposes. It can be recreational or competitive. Competitive sailing is in the form of races.

- Types of races
  - Fleet racing – involves sailboats racing one another over a set course. It is the most common form of sailboat racing.
  - Match racing – racing between two competitors, going head-to-head.
  - Team racing – also known as teams racing, is a popular form of dinghy racing and yacht racing. Two teams consisting of 2, 3, or 4 boats compete together in a race, all the boats being of the one class and reasonably evenly matched. The results of each team are combined to decide the winner
- Race formats and sailing sport events
  - Short course racing
    - Sailing at the Asian Games
    - Sailing at the Summer Paralympics
    - Sailing at the Summer Olympics
    - America's Cup
    - Cowes Week
    - Mug Race
  - Coastal/Inshore racing
    - Swiftsure Yacht Race
  - Offshore racing
    - Sydney to Hobart Yacht Race
    - Transpacific Yacht Race
    - Fastnet Race
    - Bermuda Race
    - Hamilton Island Race Week
    - Chicago Yacht Club Race to Mackinac
    - Governors Cup
    - South Atlantic Race
  - Oceanic racing
    - Volvo Ocean Race (formerly called the Whitbread Round the World Race)
    - Global Challenge
    - Clipper Round the World Race.
- Racing Rules of Sailing

- Ruling bodies
  - Austrian Sailing Federation
  - South African Sailing
  - Swedish Sailing Federation
  - Swiss Sailing
  - US Sailing
  - World Sailing

== Locations related to sailing ==
- Shipyard

== Sailing organizations ==
- International Sailing Federation
- International Association for Disabled Sailing

== Sailing publications ==
- Australian Sailing
- Blue Water Sailing
- Boat International Media
- International Boat Industry
- Motor Boats Monthly
- Practical Boat Owner
- SuperYacht Business
- Yacht Harbour
- Yachting
- Yachting Monthly
- Yachting World

== Persons influential or notable in sailing ==
- List of sailboat designers and manufacturers
- List of Olympic medalists in sailing

== Notable sailing vessels ==
- American Sailboat Hall of Fame
- List of large sailing yachts
- List of schooners
- List of large sailing vessels
- List of clipper ships
- List of longest wooden ships
- List of large sailing sloops
- List of large sailing vessels

== See also ==
- Outline of sports
- Glossary of nautical terms (disambiguation)
