= Weather vane =

Meteorological instrumentation used for showing the direction of the wind

A wind vane, weather vane, or weathercock is a type of anemoscope used for showing the direction of the wind. It is typically used as an architectural ornament to the highest point of a building. The word vane comes from the Old English word fana, meaning "flag".

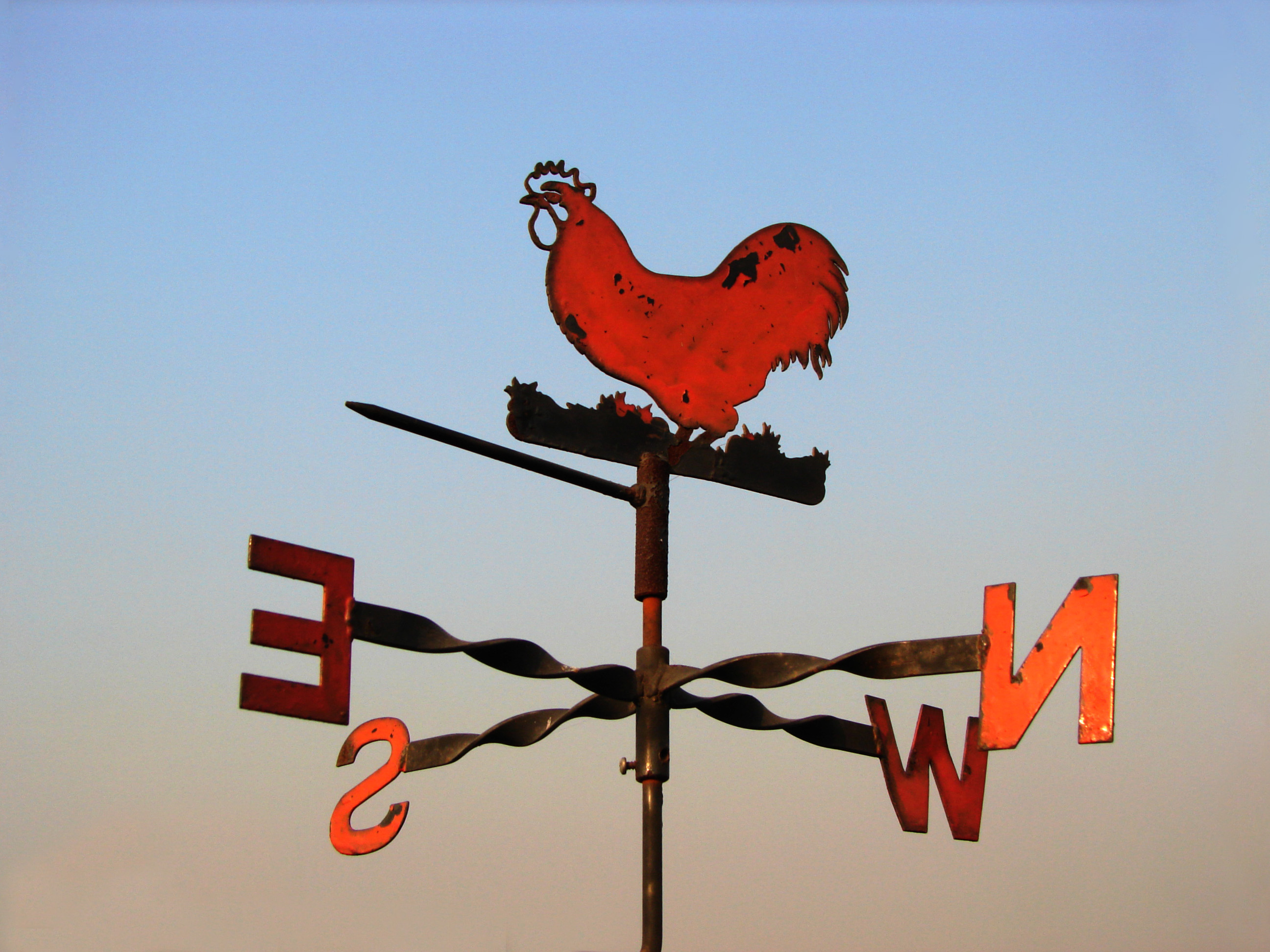
A cockerel is a traditional figure used as a vane placed on top of the cardinal directions.

Although partly functional, wind vanes are generally decorative, often featuring the traditional cockerel design with letters indicating the points of the compass. Other common motifs include ships, arrows, and horses. Not all wind vanes have pointers. In a sufficiently strong wind, the head of the arrow or cockerel (or equivalent) will indicate the direction from which the wind is blowing.

Wind vanes are also found on small wind turbines to keep the wind turbine pointing into the wind. If employed on a boat, they are referred to as apparent wind indicators.

== History ==
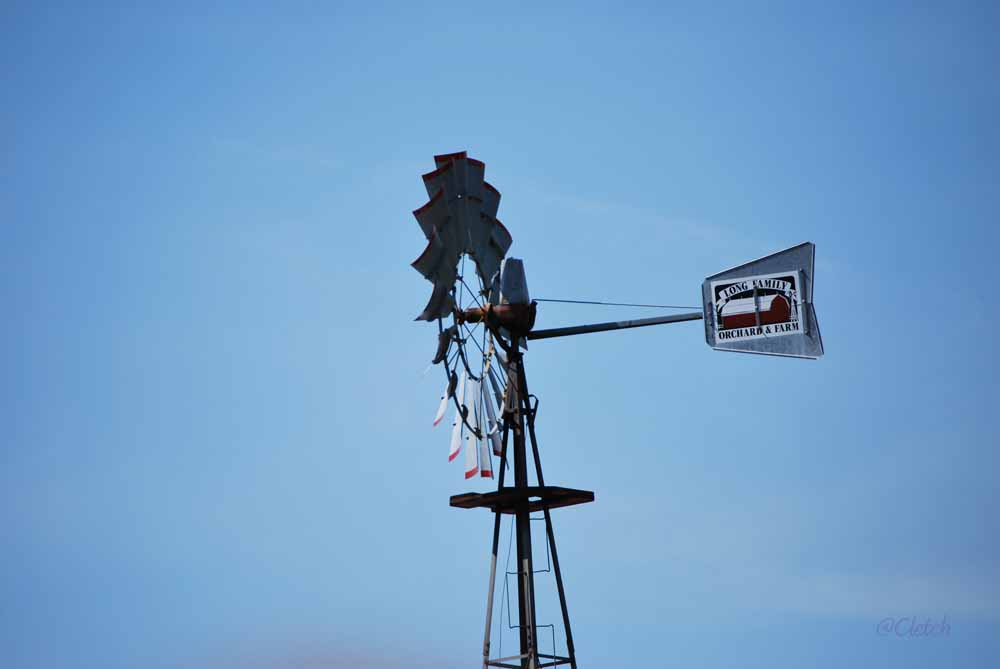
Wind vanes feature on small horizontal-axis wind turbines

The oldest known textual references to weather vanes date from 1800-1600 BCE Babylon, where a fable called The Fable of the Willow describes people looking at a weather vane "for the direction of the wind." In China, the Huainanzi, dating from around 139 BC, mentions a thread or streamer that another commentator interprets as "wind-observing fan" (hou feng shin, 侯風扇).

The Tower of the Winds in the agora in Hellenistic Athens once bore on its roof a weather vane in the form of a bronze Triton holding a rod in his outstretched hand, rotating as the wind changed direction. Below this a frieze depicted the eight Greek wind deities. The eight-metre-high structure also featured sundials, and a water clock inside. It dated from around 50 BC.

Military documents from the Three Kingdoms period of China (220–280 AD) refer to the weather vane as "five ounces" (wu liang, 五兩), named after the weight of its materials. By the third century, Chinese weather vanes were shaped like birds and took the name of "wind-indicating bird" (xiang feng wu, 相風烏). The Sanfu huangtu (三輔黃圖), a third-century book written by Miao Changyan about the palaces at Chang'an, describes a bird-shaped weather vane situated on a tower roof.

The oldest surviving weather vane with the shape of a rooster is the Gallo di Ramperto, made in 820 and now preserved in the Museo di Santa Giulia in Brescia, Lombardy.

Vikings were known for creating ornamental, gilded weathervanes. They were originally crafted to adorn longships, however, became reappropriated for church use after the ships were retired. A notable example is the Söderala vane from c. 1050.

=== Christianity ===
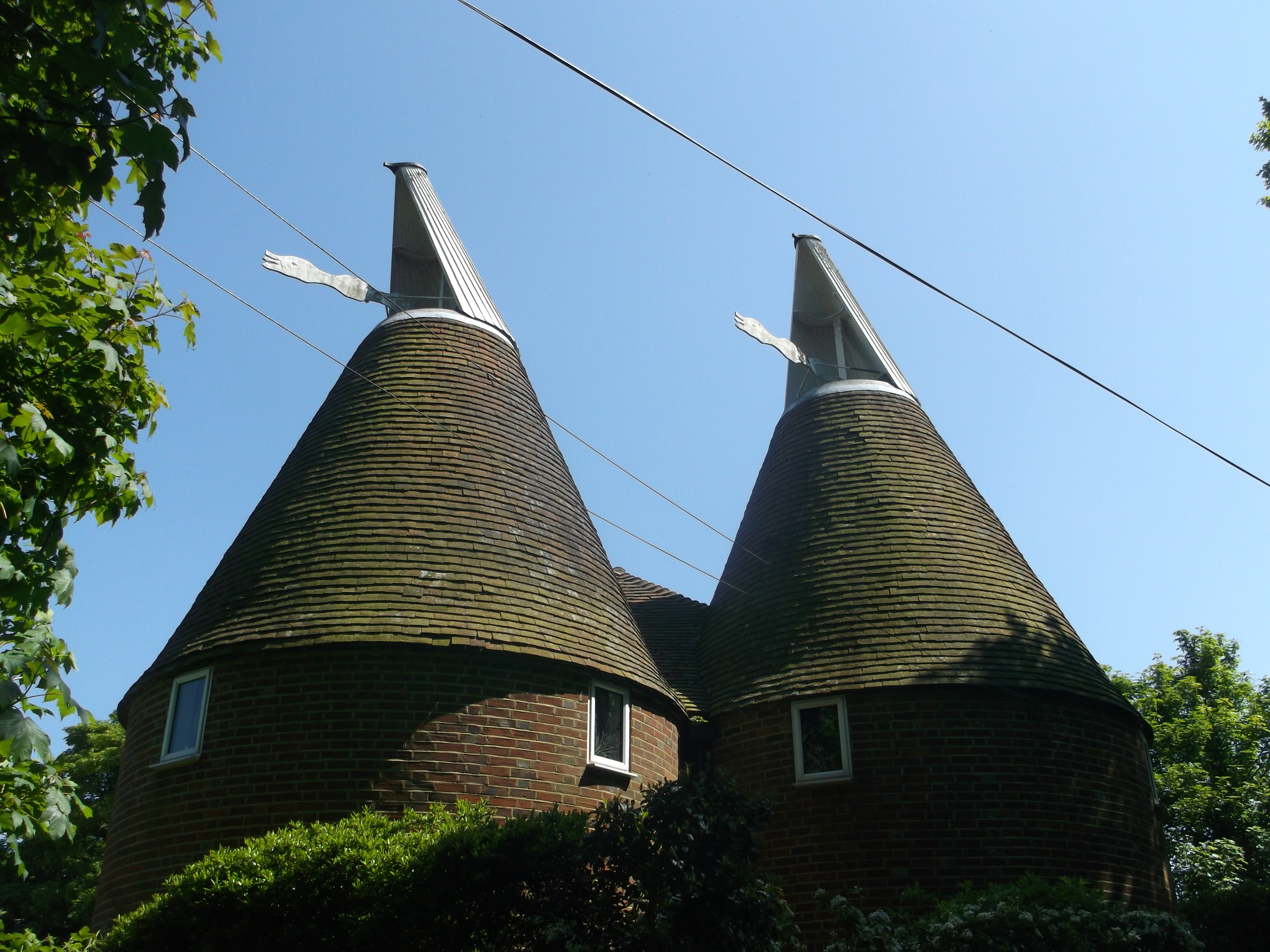
Oast houses have wind-steered vanes to ensure a controlled draught of air flows through the building.

Pope Gregory I (in office 590 to 604) regarded the cockerel as "the most suitable emblem of Christianity", being the emblem of Saint Peter (a reference to Luke 22:34 in which Jesus predicts that Peter will deny him three times before the rooster crows). Pope Leo IV (in office 847 to 855) had a weathercock placed on the Old St. Peter's Basilica or old Constantinian basilica. As a result of this, rooster representations gradually came into use as a weather vanes on church steeples, and in the ninth century Pope Nicholas I (in office 858 to 867) ordered the figure to be placed on every church steeple. The Bayeux Tapestry, likely commissioned by Bishop Odo of Bayeux in the 1070s, depicts a man installing a weathercock on Westminster Abbey.

One alternative theory about the origin of weathercocks on church steeples sees them as emblems of the vigilance of the clergy calling the people to prayer. Another theory says that the weathercock was not a Christian symbol but an emblem of the sun derived from the Goths.

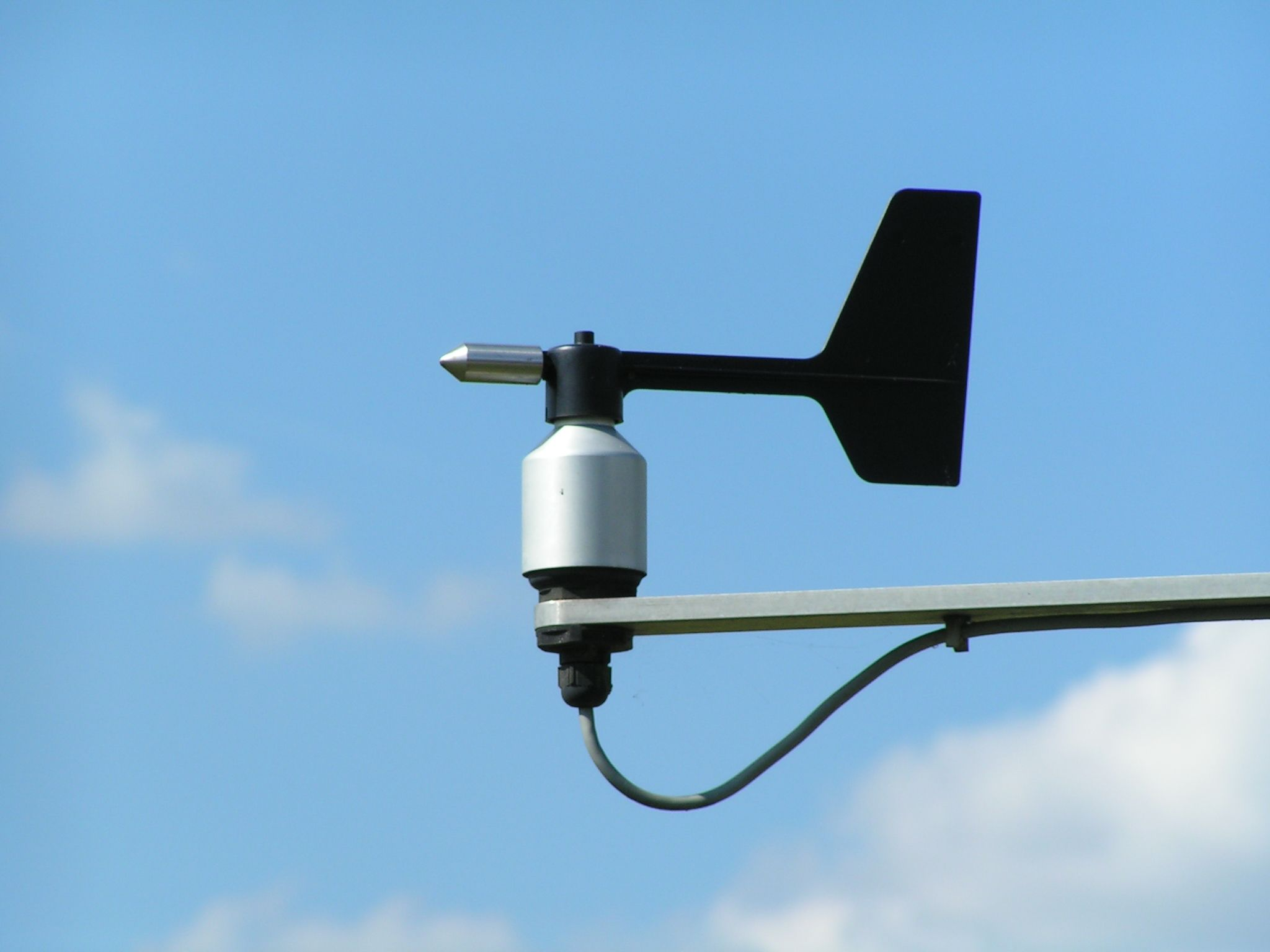
A modern scientific weathervane gives the direction of the wind as an electrical signal.

A few churches used weather vanes in the shape of the emblems of their patron saints. The City of London has two surviving examples. The weather vane of St Peter upon Cornhill is not in the shape of a rooster, but of a key; while St Lawrence Jewry's weather vane has the form of a gridiron (symbolising Saint Lawrence).

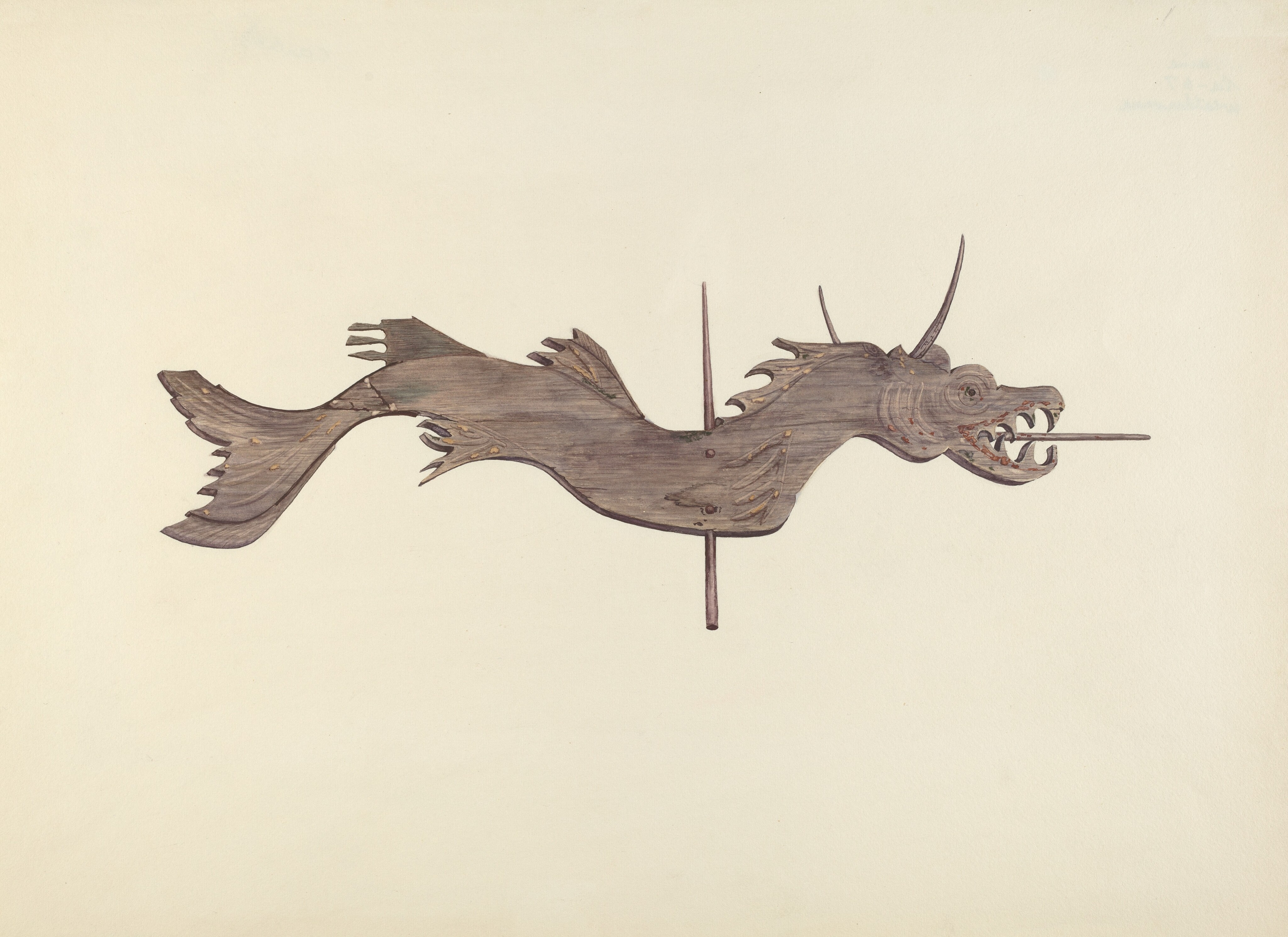
Dragon weather vane from the Index to American Design, National Gallery of Art.

== Modern use ==
Early weather-vanes had very ornamental pointers, but modern weather-vanes usually feature simple arrows that dispense with the directionals because the instrument is connected to a remote reading station. An early example of this was installed in the Royal Navy's Admiralty building in London – the vane on the roof was mechanically linked to a large dial in the boardroom so senior officers were always aware of the wind direction when they met.

Modern aerovanes combine the directional vane with an anemometer (a device for measuring the speed of the wind). Co-locating both instruments allows them to use the same axis (a vertical rod) and provides a coordinated readout.

According to the Guinness World Records, the world's largest weather vane is a Tío Pepe sherry advertisement located in Jerez, Spain. The city of Montague, Michigan also claims to have the largest standard-design weather vane, being a ship and arrow which measures 48 feet (15 m) tall, with an arrow 26 feet (7.9 m) long. A challenger for the title of the world's largest weather vane is located in Whitehorse, Yukon in Canada. The weather vane is a retired Douglas DC-3 CF-CPY atop a swiveling support. Located at the Yukon Transportation Museum beside Whitehorse International Airport, the weather vane is used by pilots to determine wind direction, used as a landmark by tourists and enjoyed by locals. The weather vane only requires a 5 knot wind to rotate. A notably tall weathervane is located in Westlock, Alberta. The classic weather vane that reaches to 59 feet (18 m) is topped by a 1942 Case Model D Tractor. This landmark is located at the Canadian Tractor Museum.

== Slang term ==
The term "weather vane" is also slang for a politician who has frequent changes of opinion, implying they take and change positions based on which way the wind is blowing (opinions of others) rather than personal or political principles, a flip flopper. The National Assembly of Quebec banned this use as unparliamentary language after its use by members.

== Gallery ==
Weather vanes
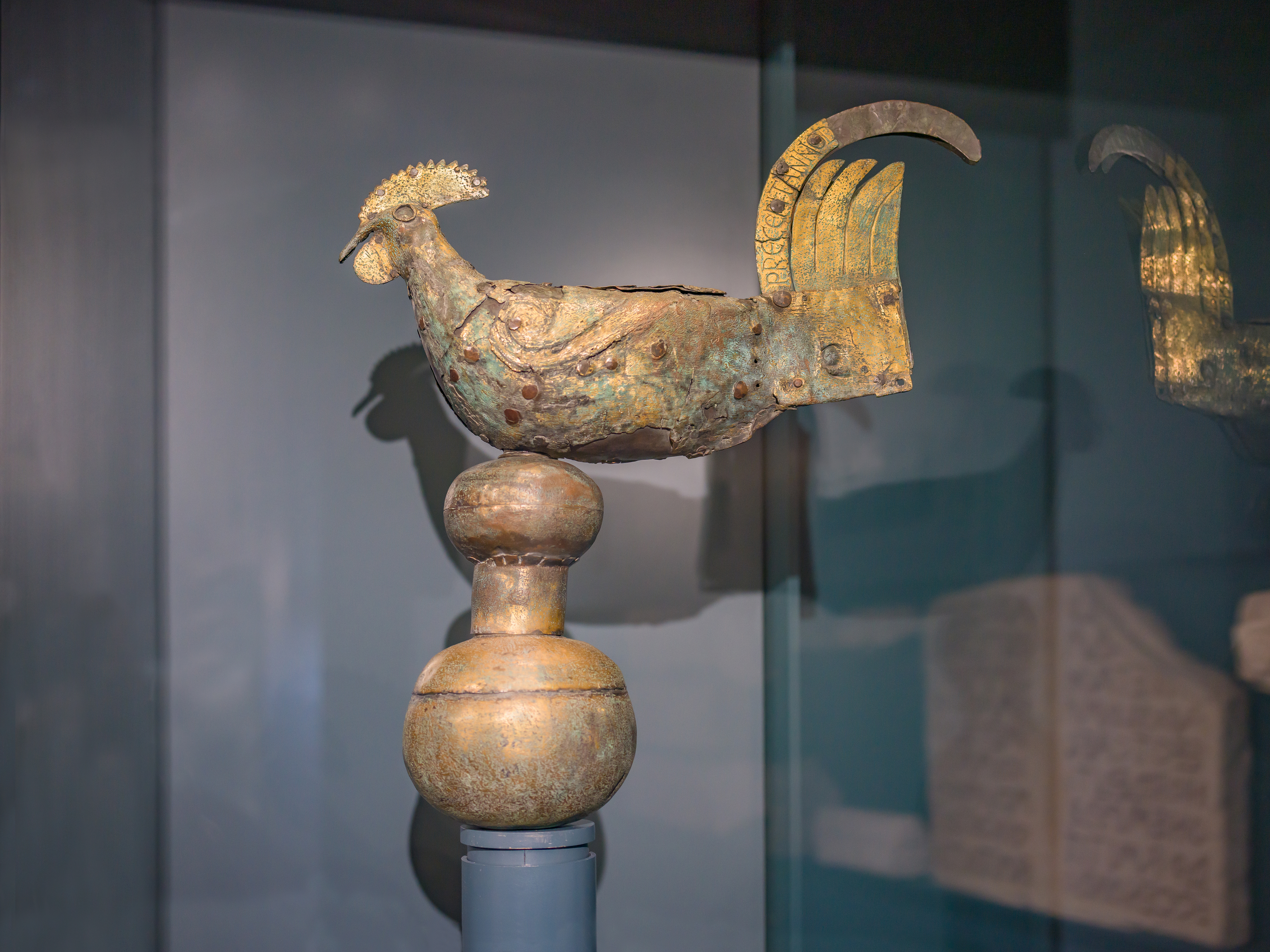
The Gallo di Ramperto, Museo di Santa Giulia in Brescia (Italy), the oldest surviving weather vane in the shape of a rooster in the world

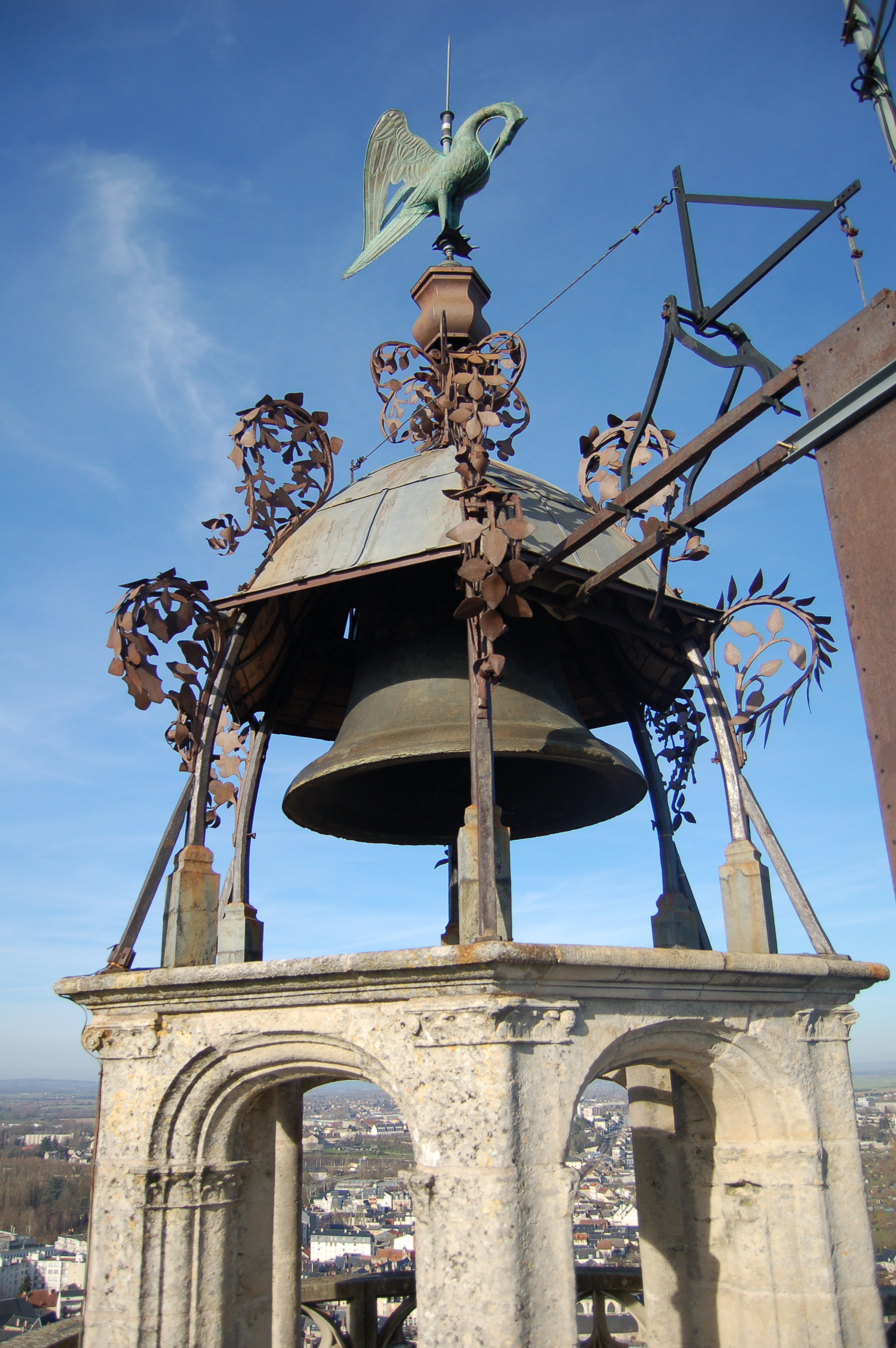
Weather vane in the shape of a pelican and bell on the roof of the Cathedral Saint-Étienne of Bourges (France)

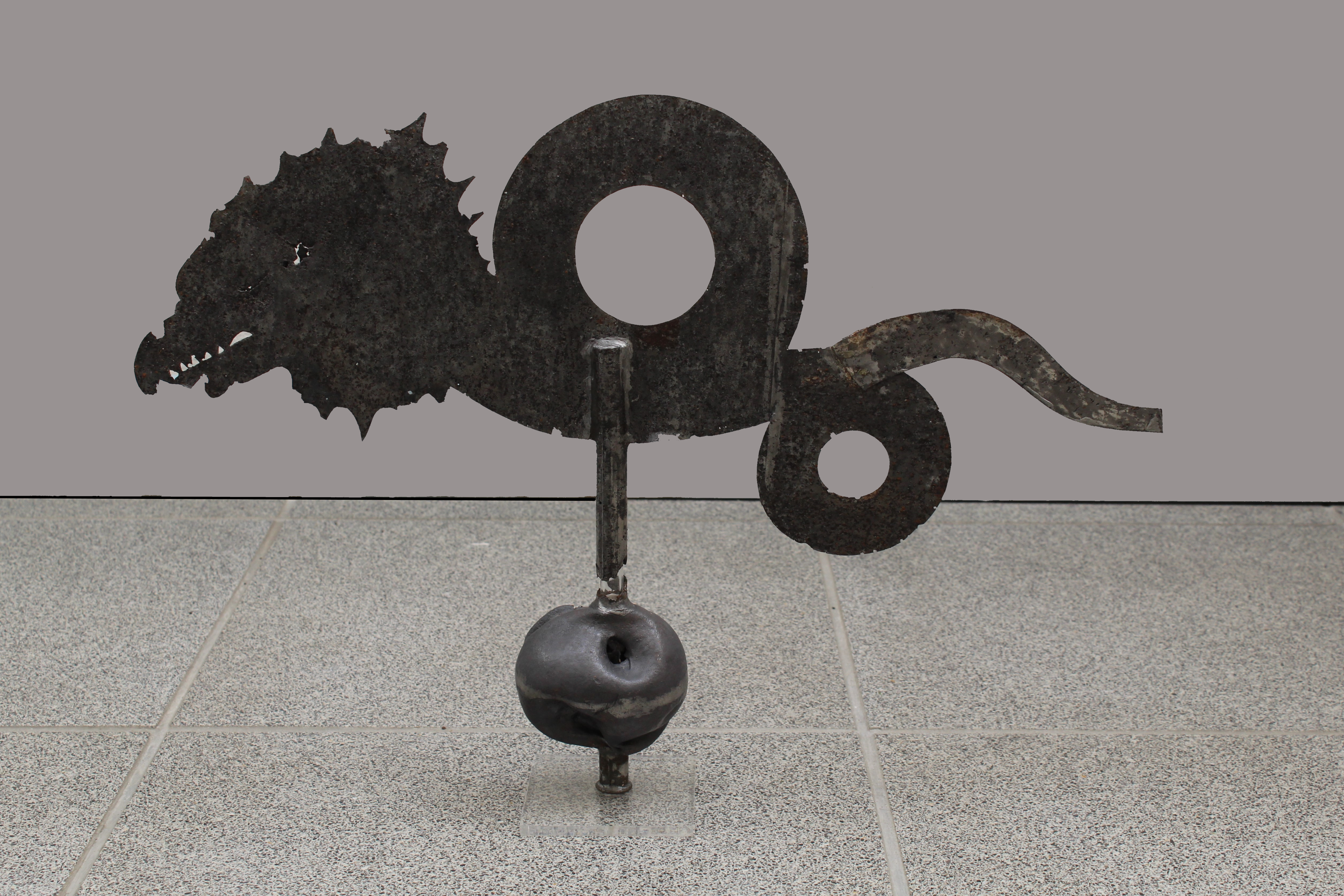
Creuë gibbet weather vane dating from the 17th century (France)

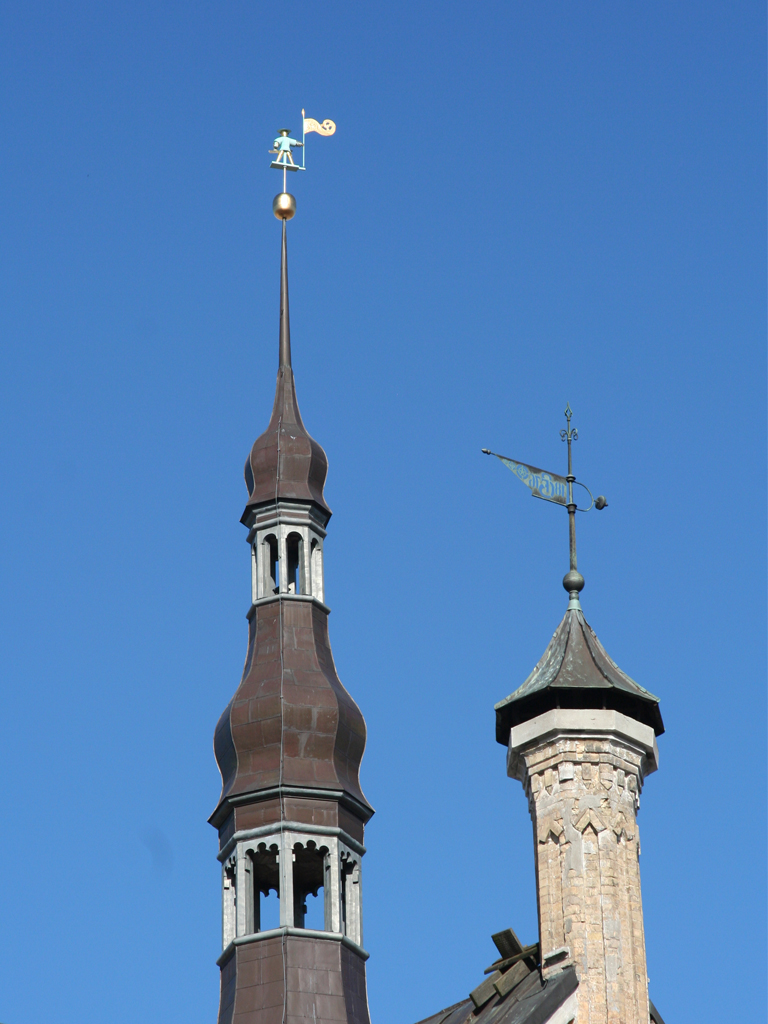
Weather vanes on the Tallinn Town Hall, the taller one is the iconic Old Thomas

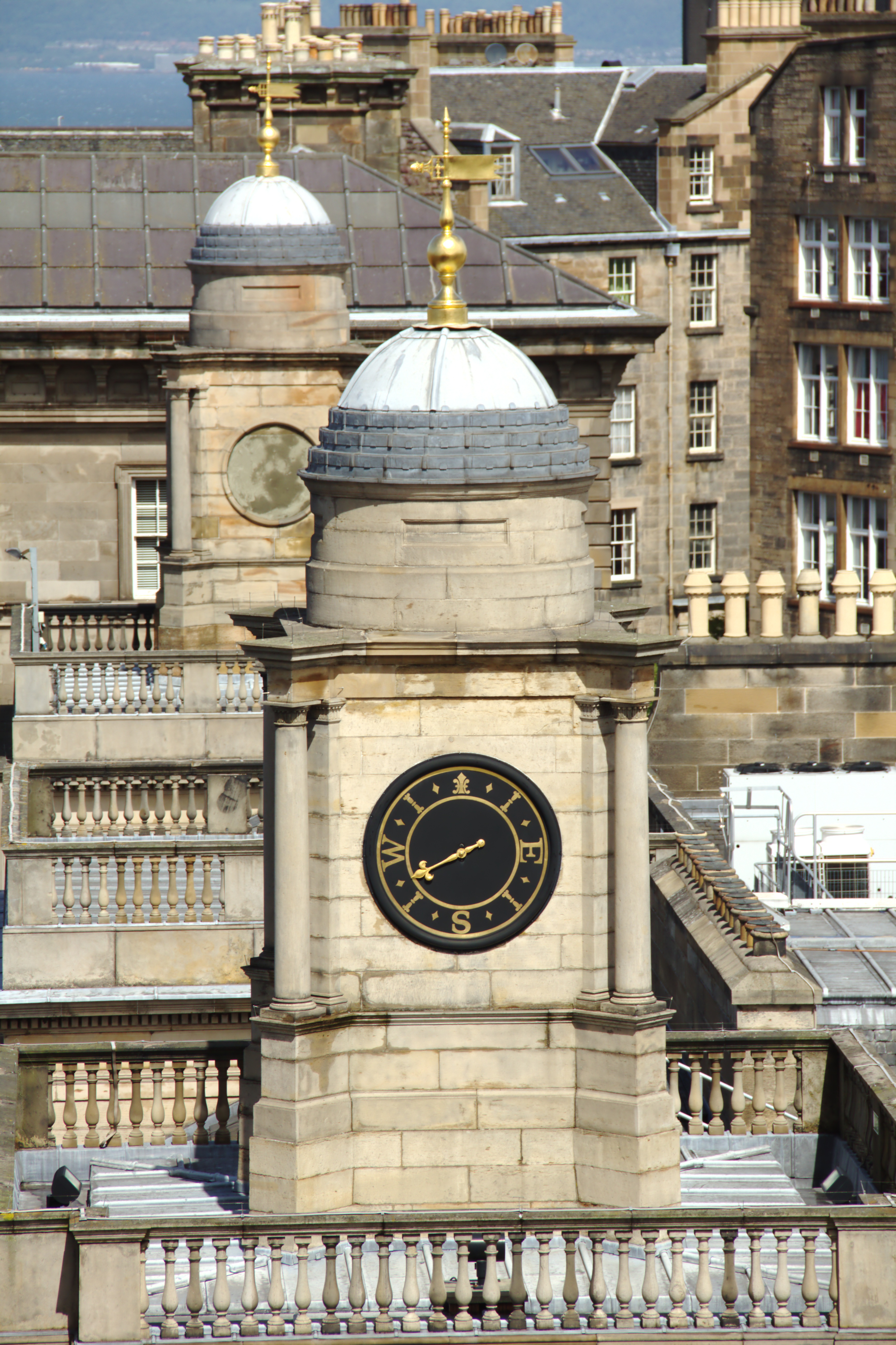
Weather vane with dial, New Register House, Edinburgh, Scotland, UK

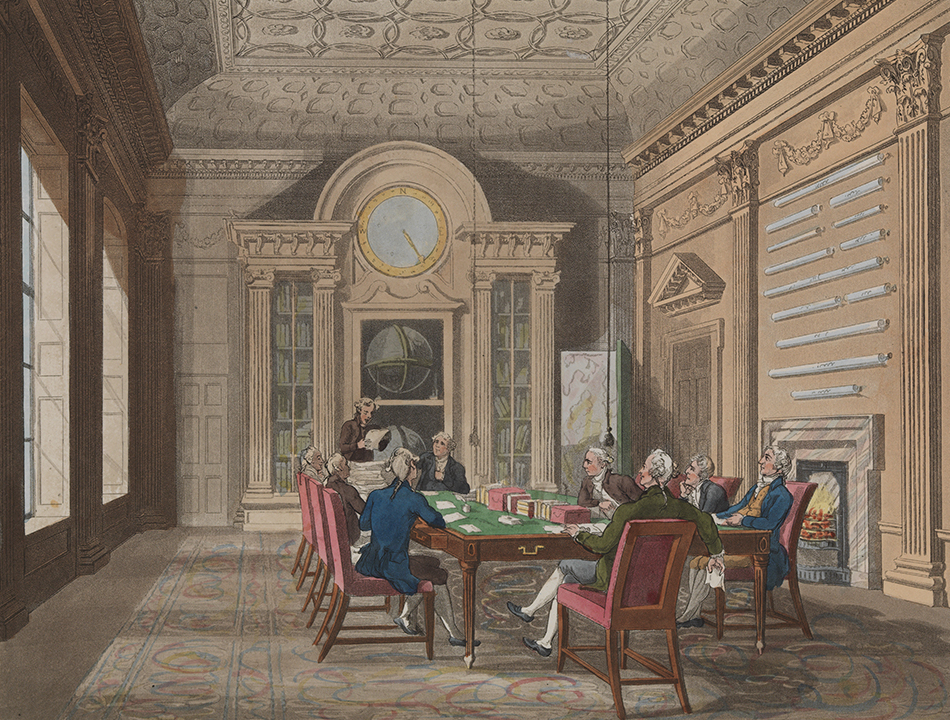
1808 illustration of the Board of Admiralty; a wind indicator can be seen on the end wall.

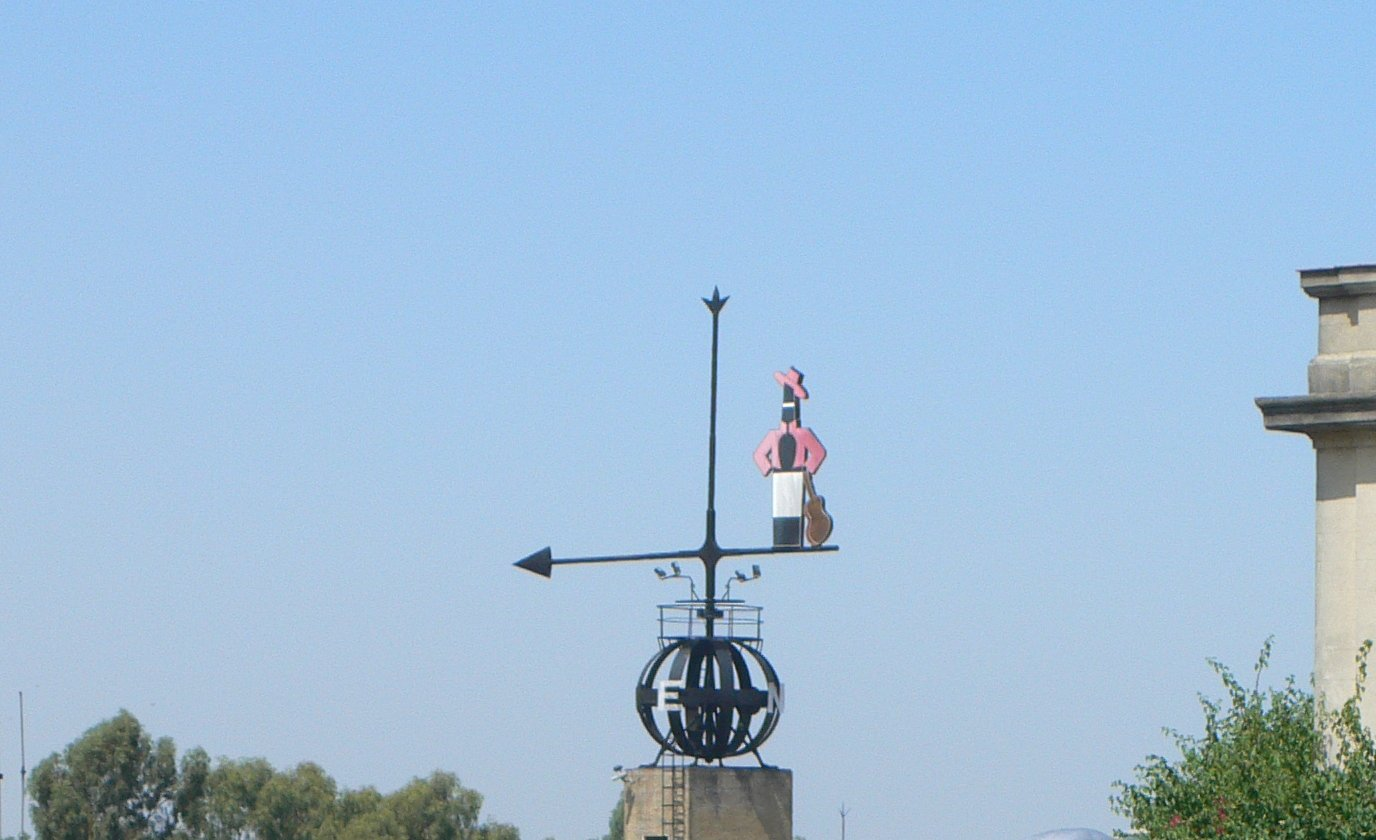
Tío Pepe weather vane in Jerez, Guinness world record of the largest weather vane that works

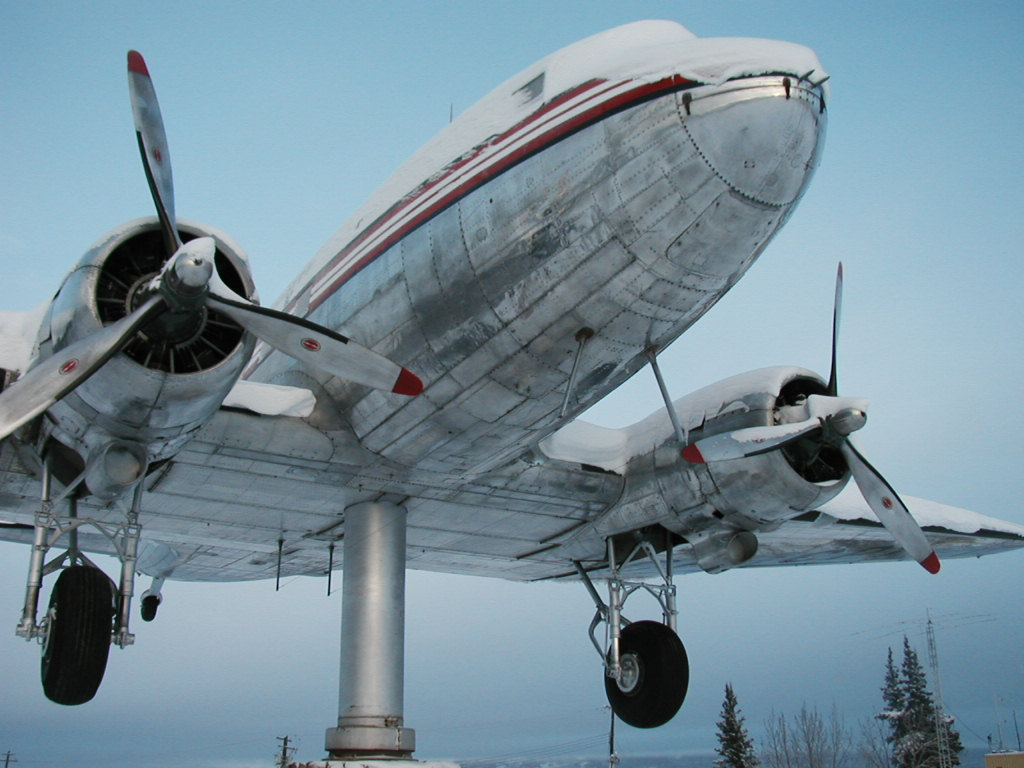
The Douglas DC-3 that now serves as a weather vane at Yukon Transportation Museum located beside the Whitehorse International Airport.

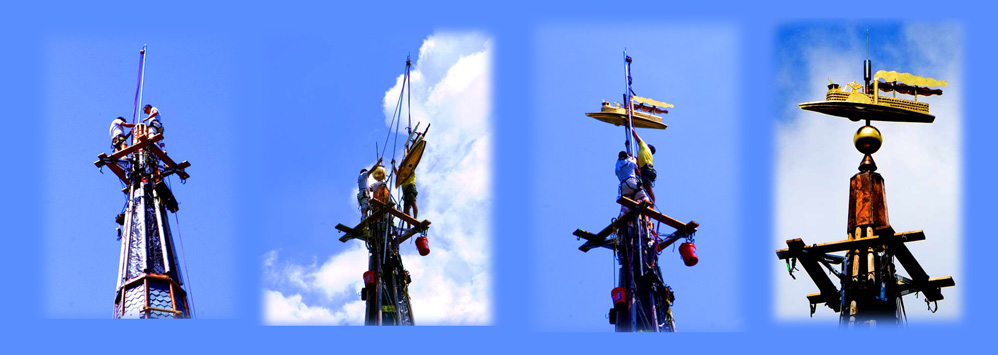
A "jin-pole" being used to install a weather vane atop the 61 m (200 ft) steeple of a church in Kingston, New York.

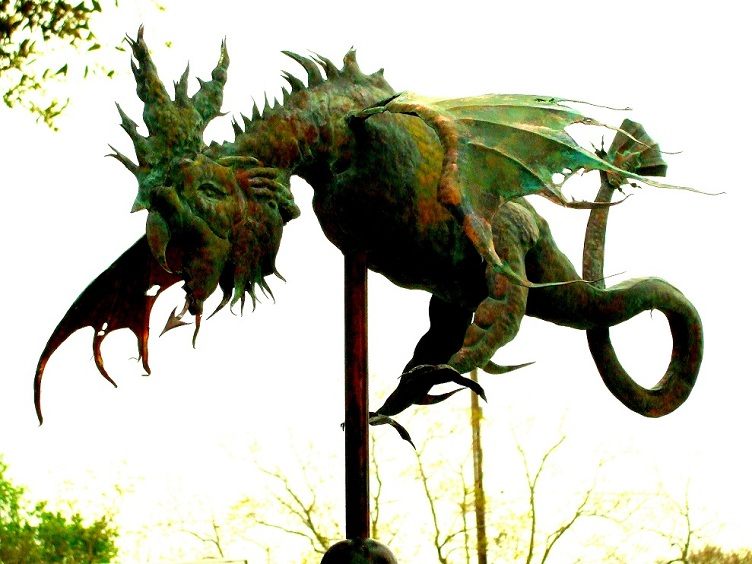
Weathercock with verdigris patina

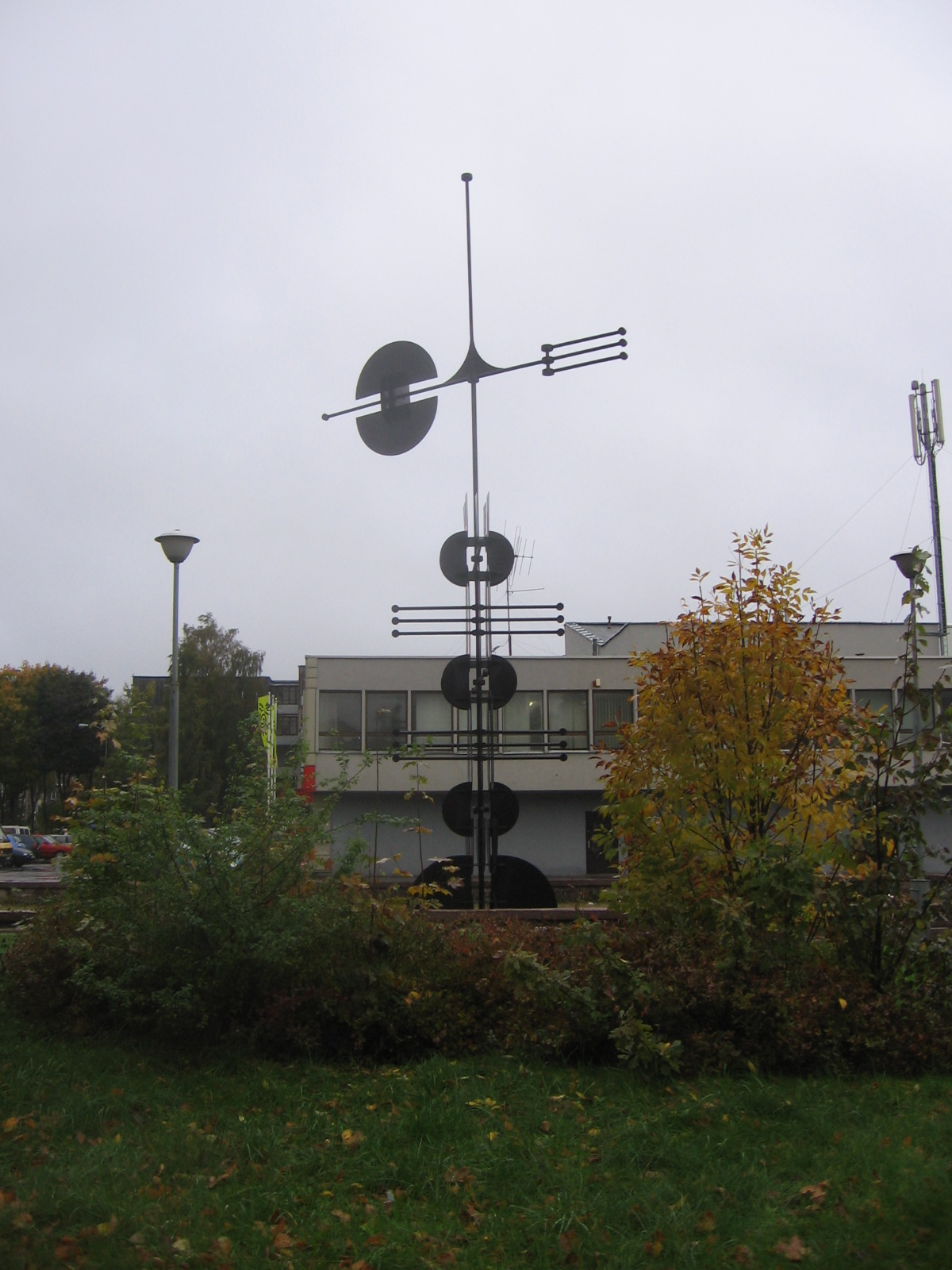
Huge weather vane in Vilnius is among the largest in Europe

Weather vane (video)

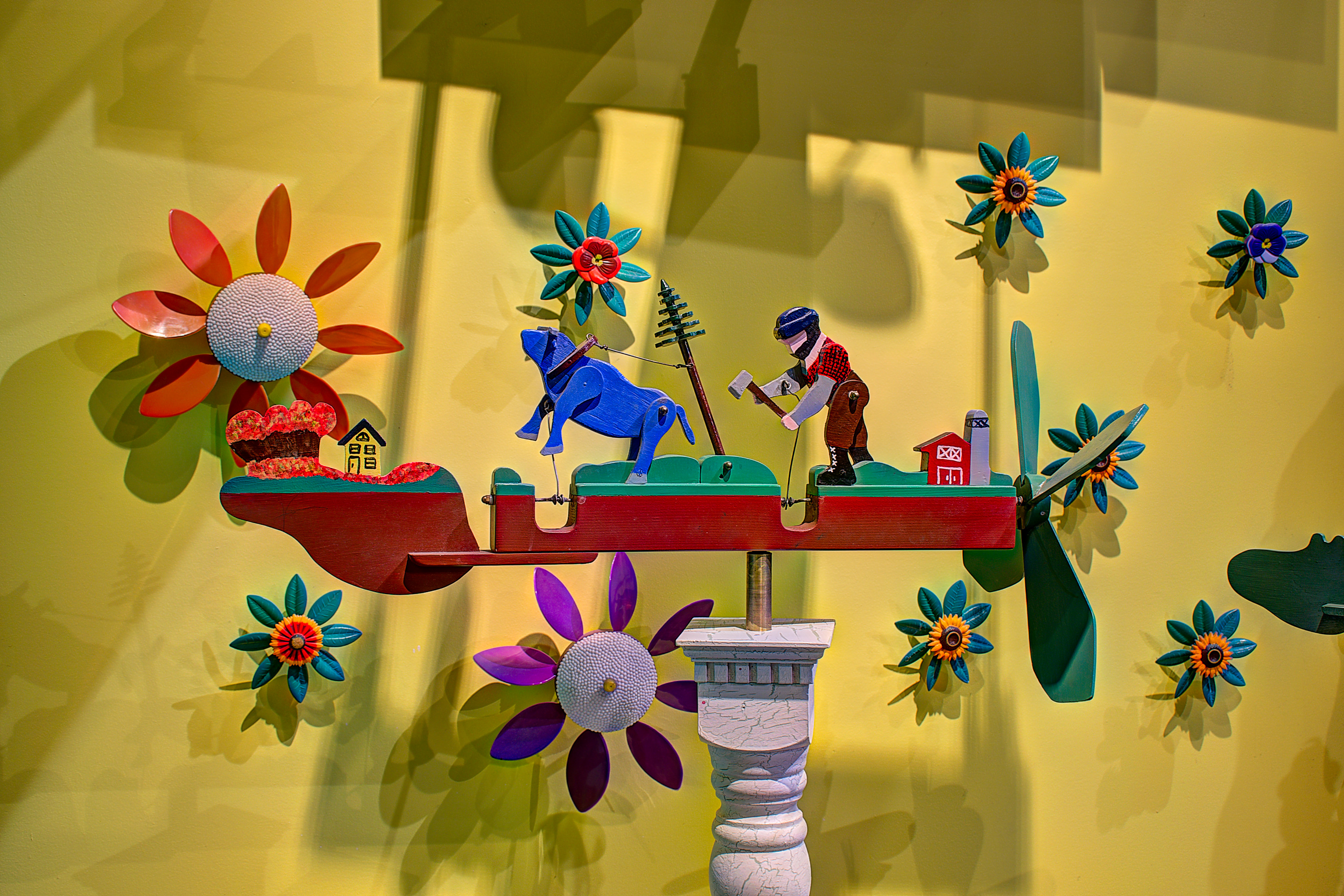
Whirligig weather vane at the Minnesota History Center

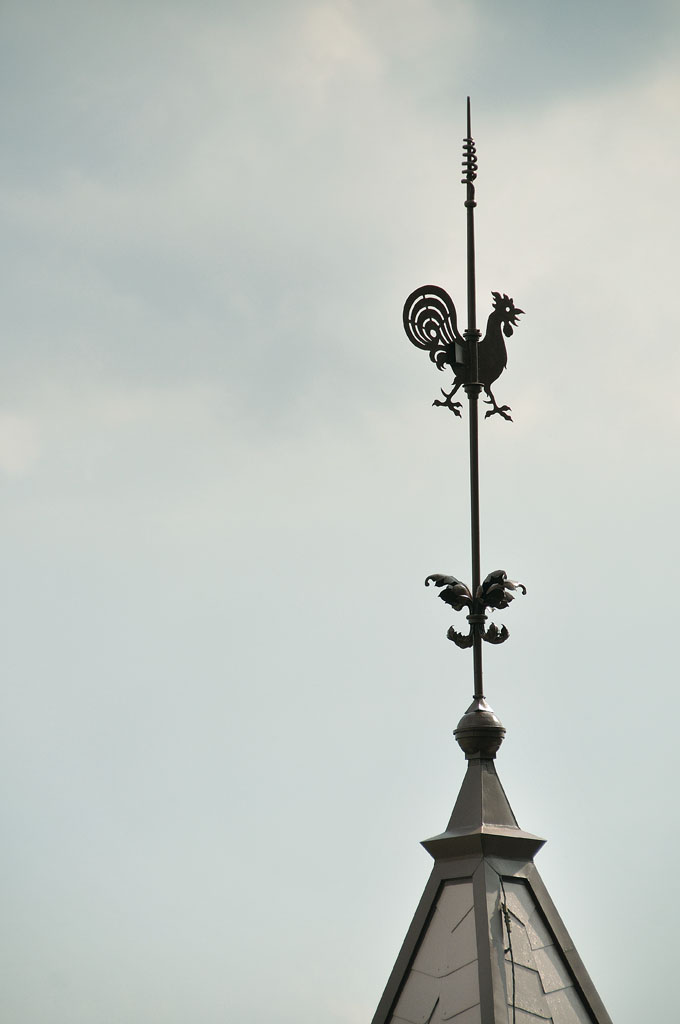
Weathercock on the former Thomas house, Kobe, Japan

== See also ==
- List of weather instruments
- Weather station
- Windsock, in aviation
