= Xiangfeng wu =

Ancient Chinese wind surveying instruments

Xiangfeng wu (Chinese: 相風烏; pinyin: xiāngfēngwū; lit. 'wind-indicating bird') were wind surveying instruments used to gather and measure the direction of the wind in ancient China.

== History ==
Prior to the invention of Xiangfeng wu, the ancient Chinese used pieces of silk or cloth that was hung on a pole to measure wind direction. Epigraphic evidence attributes the discovery of weather crow on a wall painting in a tomb dating to the Eastern Han dynasty in 1972. The Sanfu huangtu (三輔黃圖, Description of the Three Districts in the Capital), a 3rd-century book written by Miao Changyan about the palaces at Chang'an, describes a copper bird-shaped wind vane situated on a tower roof for the measurement of wind direction.

Xiangfeng wu composed of copper slices that were fixed on the top of a pole which could be revolved if the wind was blowing in a certain direction. Xiangfeng wu were first used in meteorological observatories and were later installed in government towers and private houses.

== See also ==
- Weather vane
