= Jackline =

Nautical term

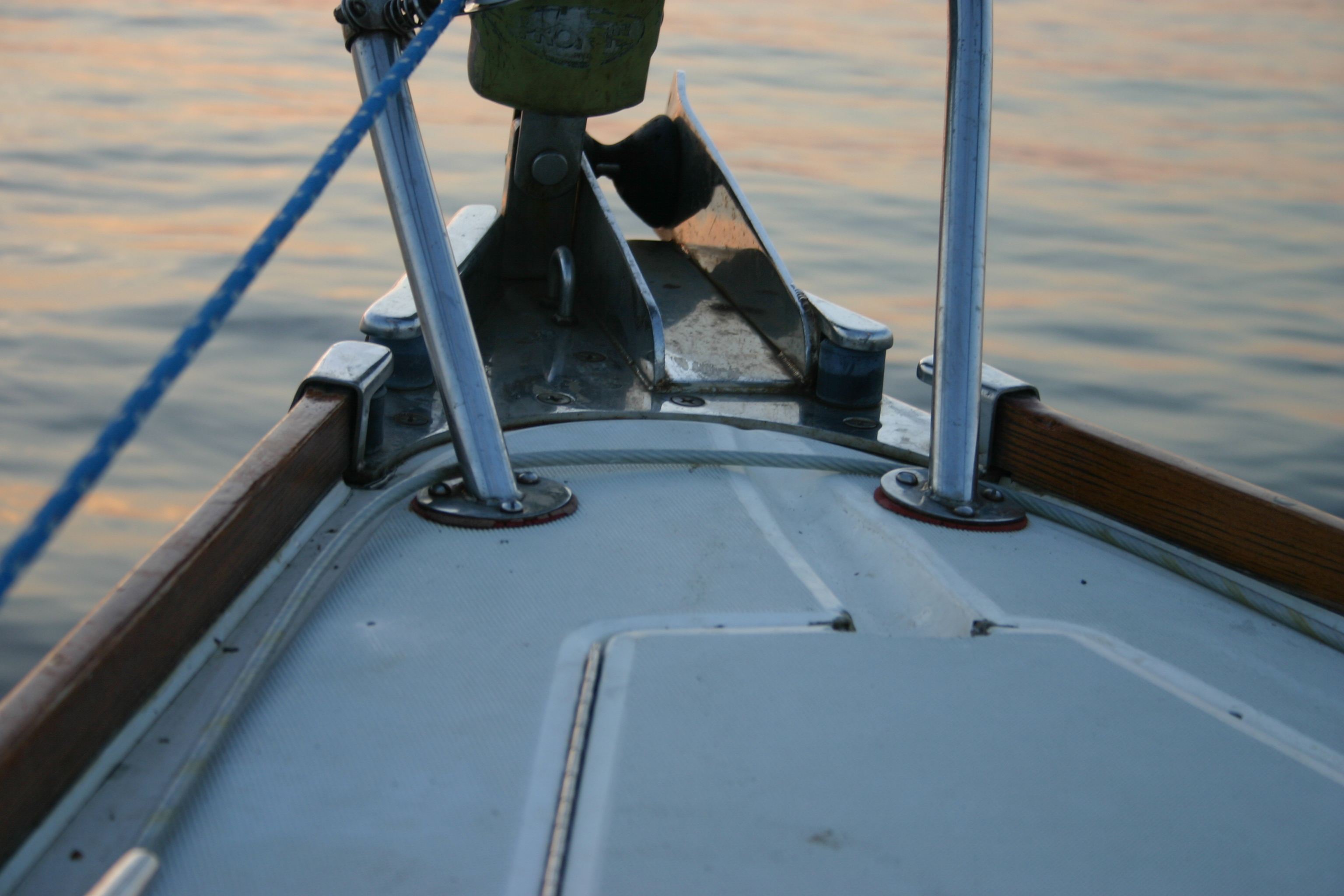
The jackline is the quarter-inch plastic-jacketed steel wire at the edge of the vessel. In this case the jackline runs from the aft starboard cleat to the bow in front of the first legs of the bow rail and back to the aft port cleat.

A jackline is a rope, wire or webbing strung from a ship's bow to stern to which a safety harness can be tethered, allowing a crewmember to move about the deck safely when there is risk of falling or being swept overboard. At sea, falling overboard is one of the leading causes of death in boating; fastening oneself to the ship with a safety harness tethered to a jackline reduces this risk.

Generally, the jacklines are run from the bow to the stern on both the port and starboard side of a ship. Jack lines are used in heavy weather and in periods of reduced visibility, i.e. fog or at night.

Jacklines may be rigged temporarily when bad weather is expected, or, especially on sailboats heading offshore, they may be left in place all the time and used as necessary. They are usually attached to strong padeye or cleat fittings at both ends of the boat, allowing the crewmember to move fore and aft by sliding their harness' clip along the line. Jacklines may be made of wire or low-stretch rope. More recently, sailors are using high strength nylon webbing. The reason is that flat webbing does not roll under foot while working on deck and there is less chance to confuse it with other lines in difficult conditions. This reduces the hazard that can be created by using rope.

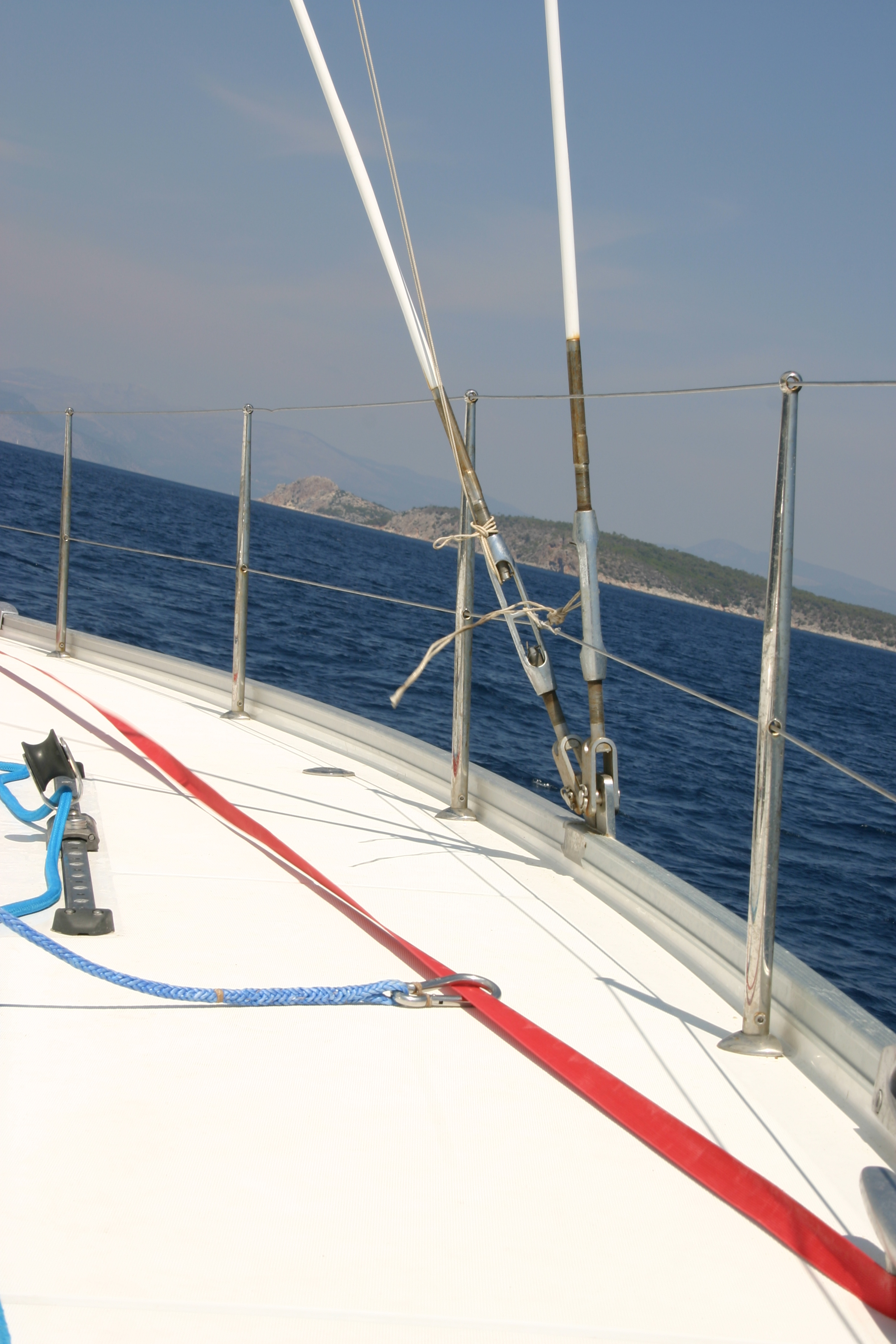
Blue safety line tied off to the red jackline with clip

A jackline is also a rope installed in the luff of a mainsail to allow the luff slides to migrate horizontally away from the mast when the sail is reefed. By allowing the slides to migrate, more space is left in the mast track for the upper luff slides to descend, making the operation easier.

== See also ==
- Turtling (sailing)
