= Studding sail =

Extra sail on a sailing ship

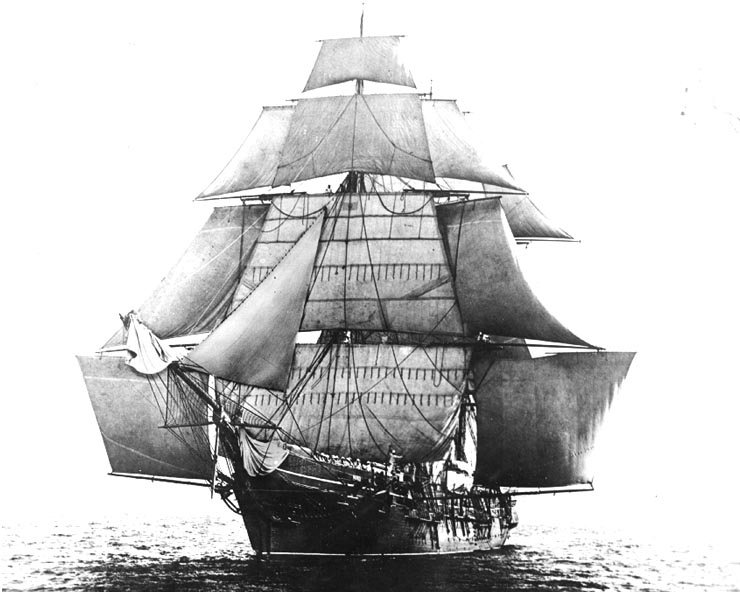
USS Monongahela with a full set of studding sails set

A studding sail, or stun'sl (pronounced stuns'l /ˈstʌnsəl/) is an extra sail on a square rigged vessel for use in fair weather. It is set outside the square sails, using stun'sl booms which run out along the yards. They came into use some time in the middle of the 17th century and by the beginning of the 19th century were usual on all square rigged sailing vessels. They started to become less common in the last quarter of the 19th century, as the economies of smaller crews and avoidance of damage to the ship's gear became more important than a fast voyage.

== History ==
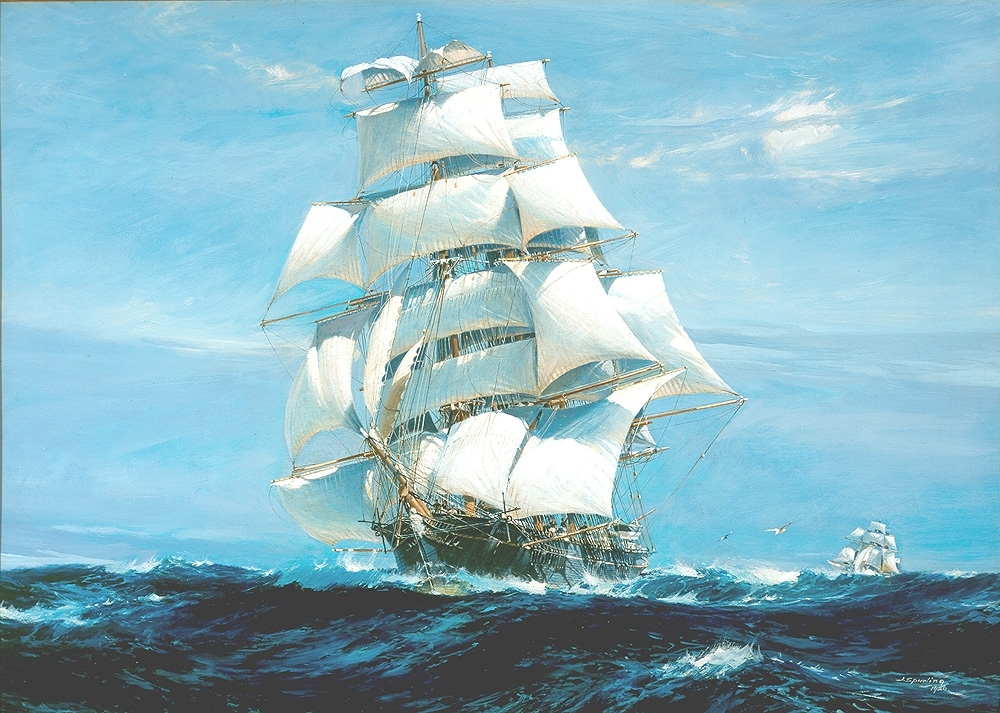
A painting of racing tea clippers by Jack Spurling, a marine artist known for his technical accuracy. This shows the reasonable maximum amount of stun'sls that could be set so that they did not interfere with each other.

The origins of studding sails are relatively uncertain. The earliest reference is in 1655, but precise information on how these early examples were rigged is unknown. It is not until 1790 that this is available. Some changes in the detail of design and usage occurred over succeeding years.

All ordinary working square-rigged vessels were usually fitted out to set stun'sls by the start of the 19th century. This started to change in the last quarter of the 19th century. As steamers took over routes and cargoes that needed fast passages, sailing vessels competed by being able to cut costs much more easily. Crew sizes were reduced, so there were fewer experienced hands to set and take in stun'sls. Any ship which pressed on in rising winds risked breaking a stun'sl boom or damaging sails–if the owner had all or some of the stun'sls sent ashore, there was less to break and these repair costs avoided. Clippers on the routes to China continued to race against each other with large crews and full suits of sails (which included stun'sls) until they also had their trade taken over by steamers in the years following the opening of the Suez Canal in 1869. As these ships took other routes, most of them had the same economies applied.

== Description ==
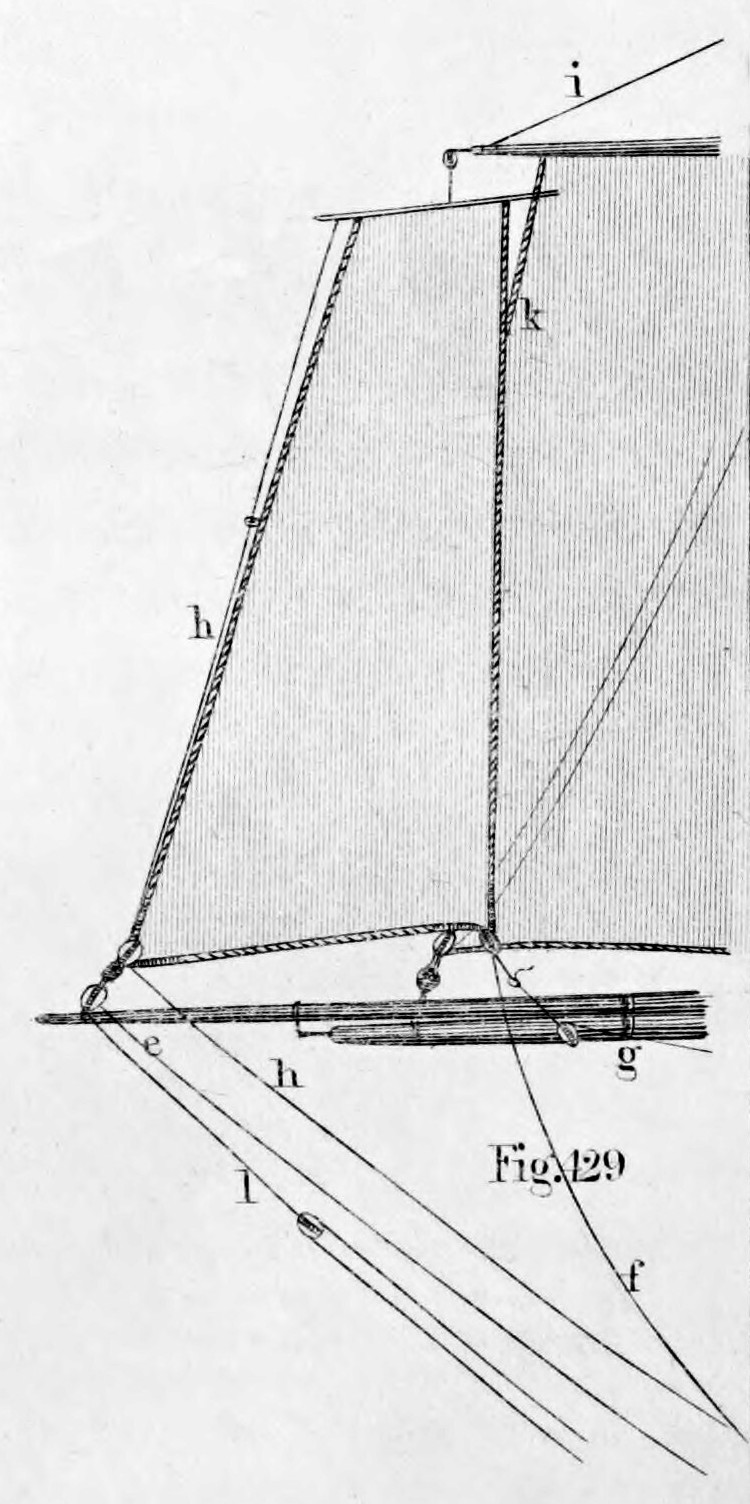
Diagram of a topmast studding sail

A studding sail is an extra sail hoisted alongside a square-rigged sail. It is named from the mast that it is set alongside: top-gallant studding sail, topmast studding sail and lower studding sail. These sails provide extra speed in fine weather.
