= SuperYacht Business =

Former yachting magazine

- Editor: Juliet Benning
- Categories: Yachting
- Frequency: Six times a year
- Circulation: 8,900
- Publisher: TI Media
- Founded: 2006
- Country: United Kingdom
- Language: English
- Website: SuperYacht Business

SuperYacht Business was a yachting magazine published by TI Media six times a year. It is edited by Juliet Benning.

== History ==
In an interview with the Guardian newspaper in 2002 IPC Media's chief executive, Sly Bailey, blamed the economic downturn for a fall in sales in their portfolio of magazines with a focus on luxury brands, such as super yachts.

== Front covers ==
Front covers have included:

- Nobiskrug
- Andrew Winch
- Dickie Bannenberg (Bannenberg Designs)
