= Padeye =

Attachment point on a boat deck

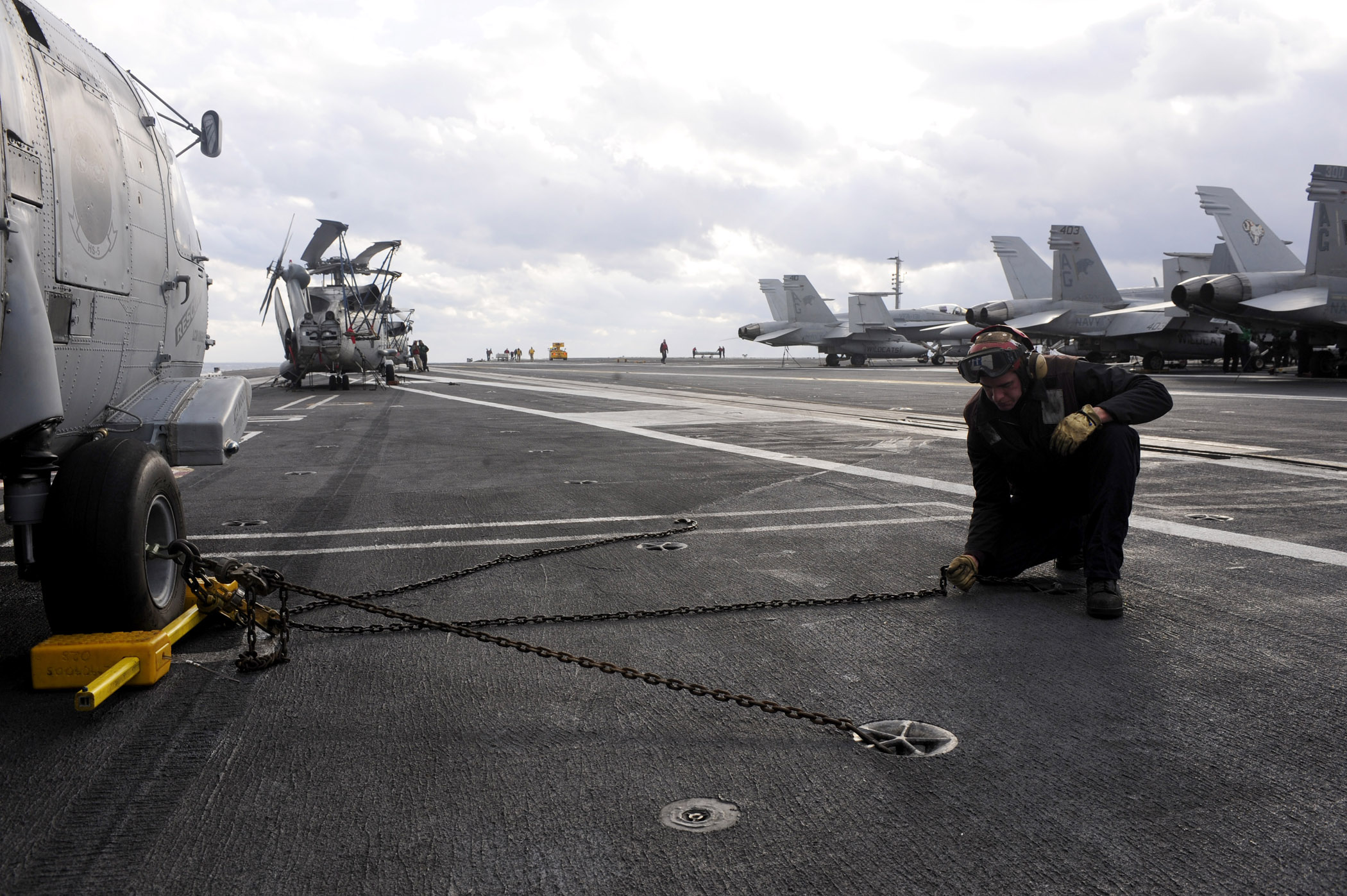
An Aviation Machinist's Mate connecting tiedown chains to padeyes on the flight deck of the aircraft carrier USS Dwight D. Eisenhower

A padeye is a device often found on boats or ships that a line runs through or provides an attachment point. It is a kind of fairlead and often is bolted or welded to the deck or hull.

It is also used in oil and gas projects to assist in the purpose of lifting.

== Detail ==
It is made of steel plate with radius at one side. Lifting is done with the help of a D-shackle or sling, which fits into the hole of the padeye. There may be one or more circular plates (cheek plates) welded around the hole.

== Designing ==
The following check should be done for the design of padeyes and to keep the stress less than the allowable stresses:

At the hole:

1. Bearing stress
2. Shear stress
3. Tensile stress
4. Hertz bearing stress

At the base

1. Shear stress
2. Tensile stress
3. Bending stress
4. Combined bending stress and tensile stress
5. Von-Mises stress

Analysis on a padeye is commonly performed in accordance with the Air Force Stress Analysis Manual or ASME BTH-1. The methodology in ASME BTH-1 only allows for axially loaded lugs, whereas the methodology in the Air Force Stress Analysis Manual allows for axial loading, transverse loading, or oblique (combined) loading.

== Failure modes ==
Tests have confirmed that there are four potential failure modes for a lug plate:

1. Tension failure at the sides of the hole
2. Crushing above the lifting pin followed by tearing tension fracture at the plate edge
3. Shear failure in the lug plate as the lifting pin attempts to plow its way towards the edge of the free plate
4. Dishing (out-of-plane buckling) failure of relatively thin lug plates that are laterally unrestrained
