= Extra (sailing) =

In sailing, an extra is a sail that is not part of the working sail plan.

The most common extra is the spinnaker. Other extras include studding sails, the modern spanker (or tallboy), and some staysails and topsails.

In yacht racing, there are often separate divisions depending on whether extras are permitted. A race or division in which extras are not permitted is commonly called a non-spinnaker or no flying sails race or division.
