= Pelican striker =

In contrast to a downward pointing dolphin striker, a pelican striker is a small vertical spar or pyramid arrangement attached to the top of the crossbar joining the two bows of a catamaran. Its purpose is to resist the upward pressure on the centre of the crossbar where the forestay is attached.
