= Apparent wind indicator =

Nautical instrument for showing wind direction

An apparent wind indicator, as found on sailboat, is a small weather vane or arrow that gives an indication of the current apparent wind direction. This indication allows the skipper to set their sails or their course for best performance, according to the points of sail.

The device is often referred to as a Windex, which is a trademark owned by Davis Instruments.

== Examples of modern apparent wind indicators for dinghies and open keelboats ==

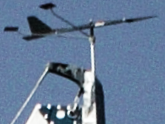
