= Gallo di Ramperto =

9th-century gilded and silvered copper weathercock in Brescia, Italy

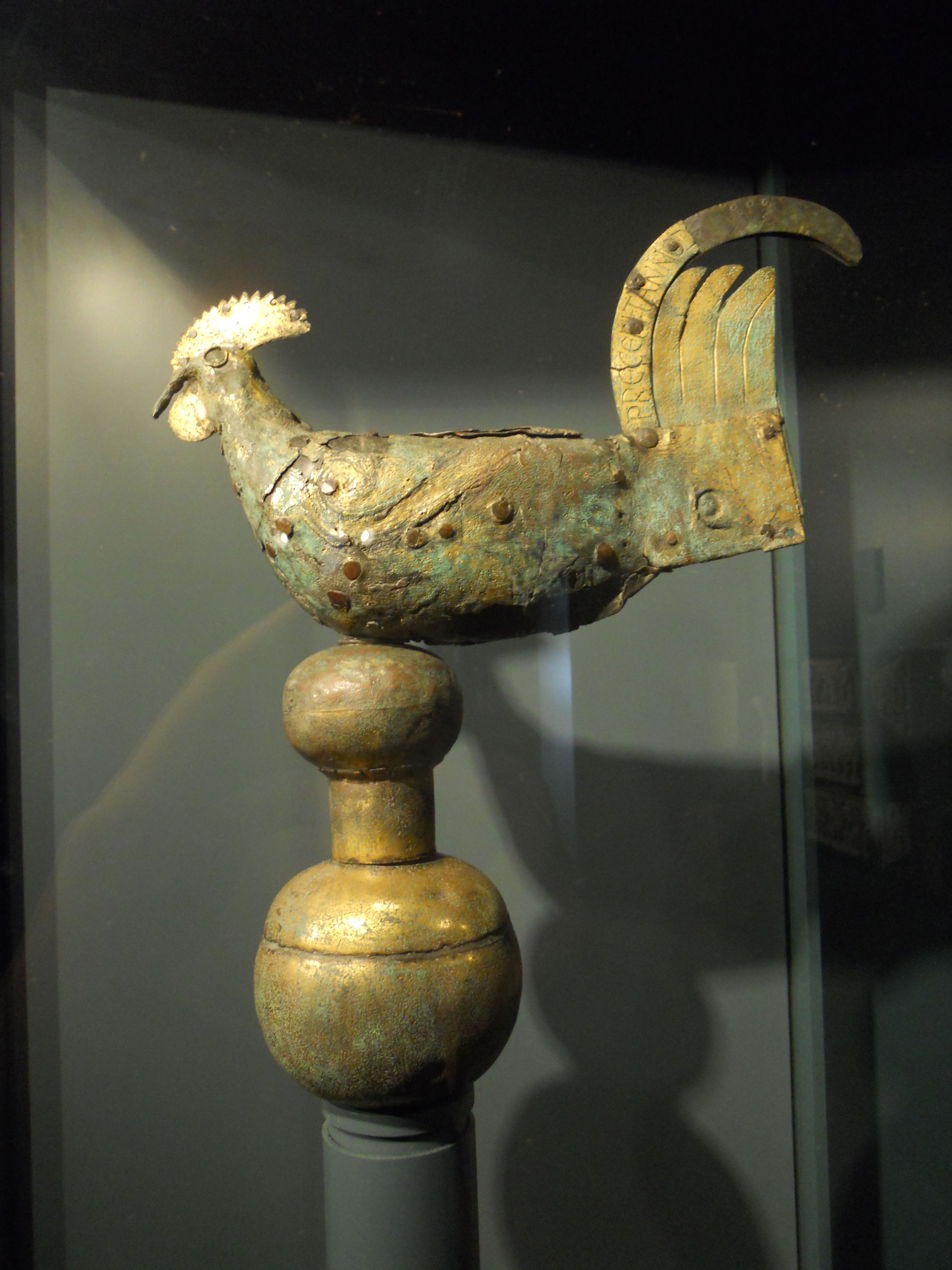
- Artist: "M [...] OALDVS"
- Year: 820 - 830
- Type: sculpture
- Medium: Copper sheet, originally gilded and silvered on an iron framework
- Location: Museo di Santa Giulia; Brescia

The Gallo di Ramperto (Ramperto's Rooster) is a weathercock made of copper sheet, originally gilded and silvered, created in the year 820 or 830 on commission of Bishop Ramperto to adorn the top of the bell tower of the Santi Faustino e Giovita in Brescia.

The rooster, removed from its position only in 1891, after more than a thousand years, to be restored and preserved in the city museum, now the Museo di Santa Giulia, is substantially intact: only the tail feathers, which originally bore the dedicatory inscription, are damaged. Dating back to the early 9th century, the "Gallo di Ramperto" can be considered the oldest surviving weathercock today, with an age of nearly 1200 years.

== History ==
=== Ramperto's contributions ===
The earliest chapters of the history of Santi Faustino e Giovita, where the creation of the rooster fits, stem from an earlier place of worship, the Church of Santa Maria in Silva, likely built in the 8th century near the Garza stream, in the densely populated north-central area of the walled city. On 9 May 806, the significant translation of the relics of the two patron saints from the Church of San Faustino ad Sanguinem (renamed in the second half of the 20th century as the Church of Sant'Angela Merici) to Santa Maria in Silva took place, giving the church considerable importance within the city's religious landscape.

A few years later, while the Diocese of Brescia was led by Ramperto, the physical condition of the church must have deteriorated: the site was no longer diligently officiated, and the veneration of the remains of the two martyrs was neglected. Ramperto, a great promoter of the cult of the patron saints, devoted significant efforts to restoring the building that housed the remains of two of the city's most important martyrs, to the extent that in 841 he made donations to support the establishment of a "cenobium monachorum" near the small church, likely encouraging an already existing religious community.

In 843, Ramperto also renewed the saints' burial ark, replacing it with one made of marble. He likely also undertook a complete reconstruction of the church and, perhaps as a gift, commissioned the weathercock to be placed atop the bell tower, with the dedicatory inscription engraved on its thick tail feathers.

=== Early records: 15th–18th centuries ===
The inscription was first published by the scholar Cosimo Lauri in 1572, after climbing to the top of the tower and reconstructing the text by cleaning the feathers. In fact, the inscription had already been recorded in 1455 on commission of Abbot Bernardo Marcello, according to the chronicler Ottavio Rossi, who in 1624 republished the inscription, claiming to have copied it from Marcello's record. The inscription, now largely lost (see below), read: "DOMNVS RAMPERTVS EPISCOPVS BRIXIANVS GALLVM HVNC FIERI PRECEPIT ANNO D. N. YHY XPI R. M. OCTOGENESIMO VIGESIMO INDICTIONE NONA ANN. TRANSL. SS. DECIMOQVARTO SVI EPISCOPATVS VERO SEXTO", specifying the name of the donor, Ramperto, some chronological details, and, most importantly, the date of the rooster's installation, the year 820, just fourteen years after the translation of the saints' remains and thus well before the monastery's foundation. However, historians would later debate this date extensively.

The statuette remained in place, largely ignored, for about seven hundred years until Cosimo Lauri, as mentioned, discussed it in his Catalogus Episcoporum Brixianorum of 1572, reporting the inscription and deducing its origins. Fifty years later, Ottavio Rossi addressed it, followed shortly after, in 1670, by the chronicler Bernardino Faino, who similarly traced its history based on the inscription on the tail.

The matter was revisited in 1728, when Gian Andrea Astezati, a monk from the monastery, discussed the rooster again and, after boldly climbing to the top of the bell tower, described its condition and inscription: according to his account, the weathercock was in very poor condition, and the inscription had become barely legible, leading the monk to raise the first doubts about its authenticity. Finally, in 1748, the scholar Gian Maria Biemmi classified the rooster as a poorly executed fake, stating that the work "contains the grace and beauty of a time when the arts and studies [sic] flourished, suggesting that its creation should be dated after the 14th century", i.e., after the 15th century. Biemmi, therefore, attributed the rooster's creation to Abbot Bernardo Marcello, who in 1455 was the first to transcribe the inscription on the tail. In particular, the improbable production date of 820 was contested, as it coincided with, if not followed, Ramperto's election as Bishop of Brescia, invalidating the date inscribed on the tail.

=== 19th century: Damage and removal ===
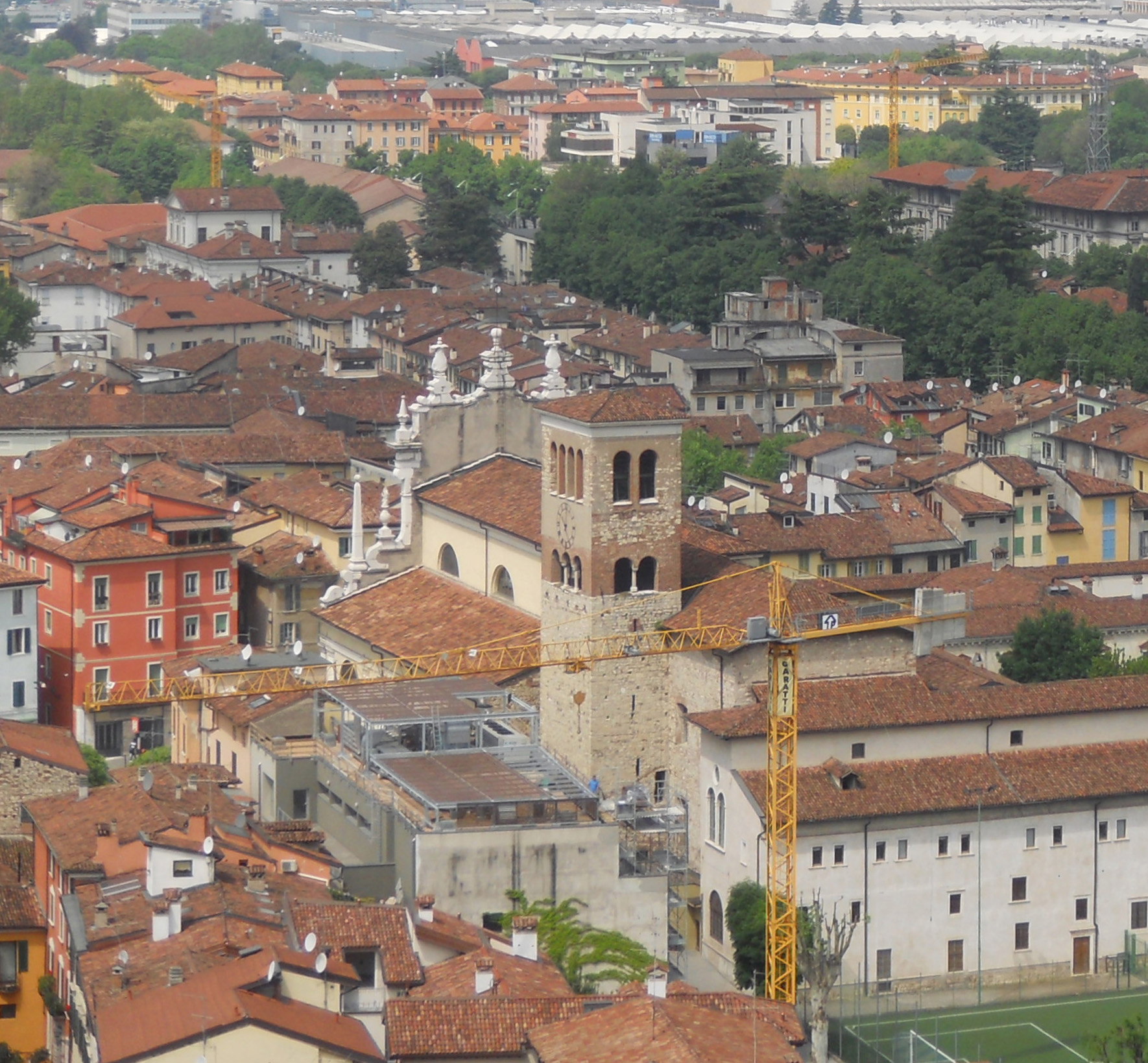
The Church of Saints Faustino and Giovita seen from the Brescia Castle: the ancient bell tower with its varied stratigraphy is visible, topped by the current copy of the Rooster.

In 1797, with the fall of the Republic of Venice, Brescia came under the control of Napoleon Bonaparte and a local provisional government of Jacobin orientation. The suppression of religious orders fully affected the Monastery of San Faustino, which, after over a thousand years of existence, was transferred to state property and turned into a military barracks. The church, however, was entrusted to the care of the Franciscans, remaining open and officiated. The weathercock was mentioned again in 1853, when Federico Odorici, in his Storie Bresciane dai primi tempi sino all'età nostra, recounted climbing to the top of the bell tower and analyzing the artifact and its inscription, describing the latter as "of dubious date, of even more dubious meaning", concluding with a curt "if there is one certain thing, it is precisely this, that you will thank me immediately for not speaking of it further."

It is thus in the second half of the 19th century that the rooster's damage can be dated, caused by soldiers in the barracks who found amusement in shooting at it from the ground. Most of the tail feathers broke and detached, resulting in the loss of much of the inscription engraved on them. Odorici was likely the last person to read it directly.

In 1891, the Commission of the Museo Patrio, overseeing the newly established city museum, wrote to the parish of San Faustino requesting the donation of the rooster, as keeping it atop the tower "would be tantamount to exposing it to total ruin, without any monumental or artistic benefit, so to speak, to the bell tower; whereas, seen and studied up close, it could offer considerable interest to those who cherish local memories or enjoy archaeological studies." The proposal was accepted on the condition that "its ownership remains reserved and safeguarded," and with the appropriate authorization from the prefecture, the artifact was removed from its position, after more than a thousand years, and brought to the museum.

=== 20th-century studies ===
The first serious study of the work was conducted in 1905 by the philologist Francesco Novati, who analyzed it thoroughly and drew his conclusions: "nothing prevents us from accepting the date provided by the inscription as true and considering it certain that Ramperto succeeded Pietro between 814 and 815, but it is always imprudent to pronounce absolute judgments on controversies of such delicate nature. We will therefore be content to say that, as far as our limited epigraphic and paleographic knowledge allows us to affirm, the characters of the Rampertian inscription, clear and elegant, offer nothing that deviates from the lapidary script of the 9th century."

In 1929, Fedele Savio conducted an extensive study on the statuette, focusing not on its authenticity but on the appropriateness of considering the inscription correct, suggesting that it contains a fundamental error in the calculation of the indiction, a concept still quite vague in the 9th century. According to Savio, the error lies where the inscription reads "OCTOGENESIMO VIGESIMO INDICTIONE NONA", concluding that the ninth indiction does not correspond to the year 820 but to 830, shifting the entire chronology of the rooster's origins, including the date of Ramperto's election as Bishop of Brescia, by ten years.

The issue was partially resolved in the second half of the 20th century with the recovery of fundamental texts from the period, which allowed Ramperto's election to be securely dated to 815. However, this does not directly confirm the accuracy of the rooster's inscription, as the artifact could still have been installed in 820 or 830. The only possible conclusion is that 820 as the production date becomes acceptable again, something Savio had excluded based on his reasoning.

In 1938, on the occasion of the 500th anniversary of the appearance of the two patron saints on the ramparts of Roverotto, an event that drove off Milanese troops and ended the siege of the city, a copy of the rooster was made to be placed again atop the church's bell tower, which had been restored and raised the previous year, deserving a fitting completion. The original rooster found its permanent display at the Museo di Santa Giulia in 1999, in the section "The Early Middle Ages - Lombards and Carolingians", after a thorough restoration.

== Description ==
The following is the detailed descriptive summary provided by the philologist Francesco Novati in 1905: "the rooster of San Faustino Maggiore, the dean of all surviving bell tower roosters, is made of an iron framework, over which the ancient 'plumbarius,' with the aid of numerous nails, skillfully wrapped a sheet, possibly double, of thinly beaten and curved copper to give the object the necessary relief to represent a rooster of proportions slightly smaller than life-size. [...] That the rooster was originally entirely gilded is confirmed not only by the unanimous assertions of all who mention it but also by the more or less visible traces of gilding still preserved, particularly in the wattles. The two spheres on which the rooster rests were also gilded and remain so today: the lower one, with a diameter of 20 centimeters; the upper one, 15 centimeters. In keeping with its intended function, the rooster, not fixed but pivoted on the spheres, was designed to yield easily to every breeze, thanks to its wide and flattened tail. [...] On the tail, it bore an inscription on both sides certifying the nobility and antiquity of its origin. Now, only a few disconnected words of the inscription remain. On the largest tail feather, one side clearly reads: PRECEPIT ANNO D; on the other, the remnants are even scarcer, reduced to O SEXTO."

Additionally, at the base of the artifact is the signature of the author, heavily damaged and legible only as "M [...] OALDVS."

== In cinema ==
In 2010, the medium-length film Il Gallo di Ramperto was produced in Brescia by directors Silvia Cascio and Vittorio Bedogna, with music by Carlo Poddighe and contributions from Simone Agnetti and Piero Galli. The film won the International Migration Art Festival at the Teatro Dal Verme in Milan in 2011. In the plot, the lives of a group of children of different ethnic origins, united under the roof of the San Faustino oratory, are disrupted by Ramperto's prophecy: if the true Rooster does not return to the bell tower, the city of Brescia will be destroyed.

== Image gallery ==
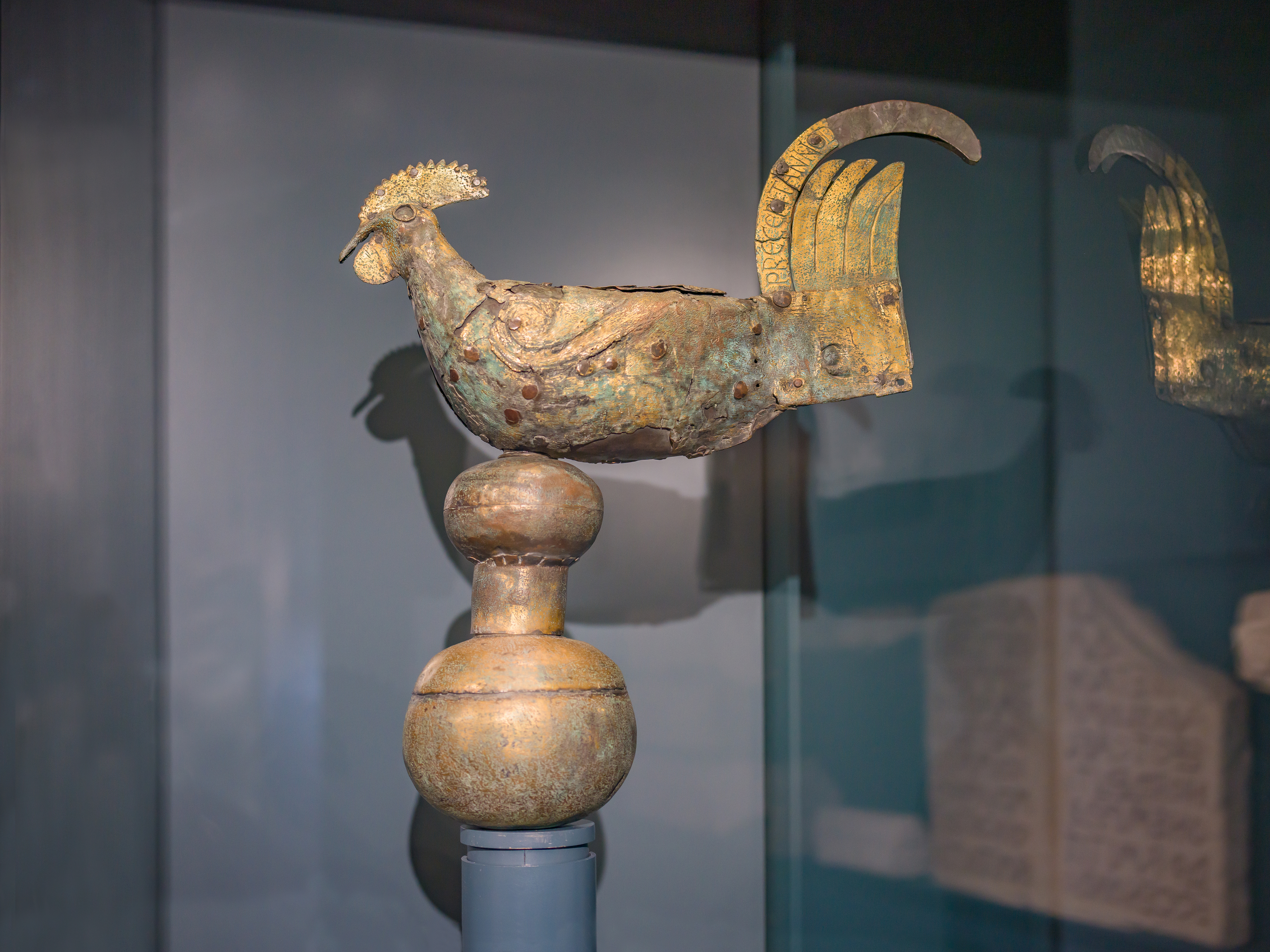
Another view of the artwork

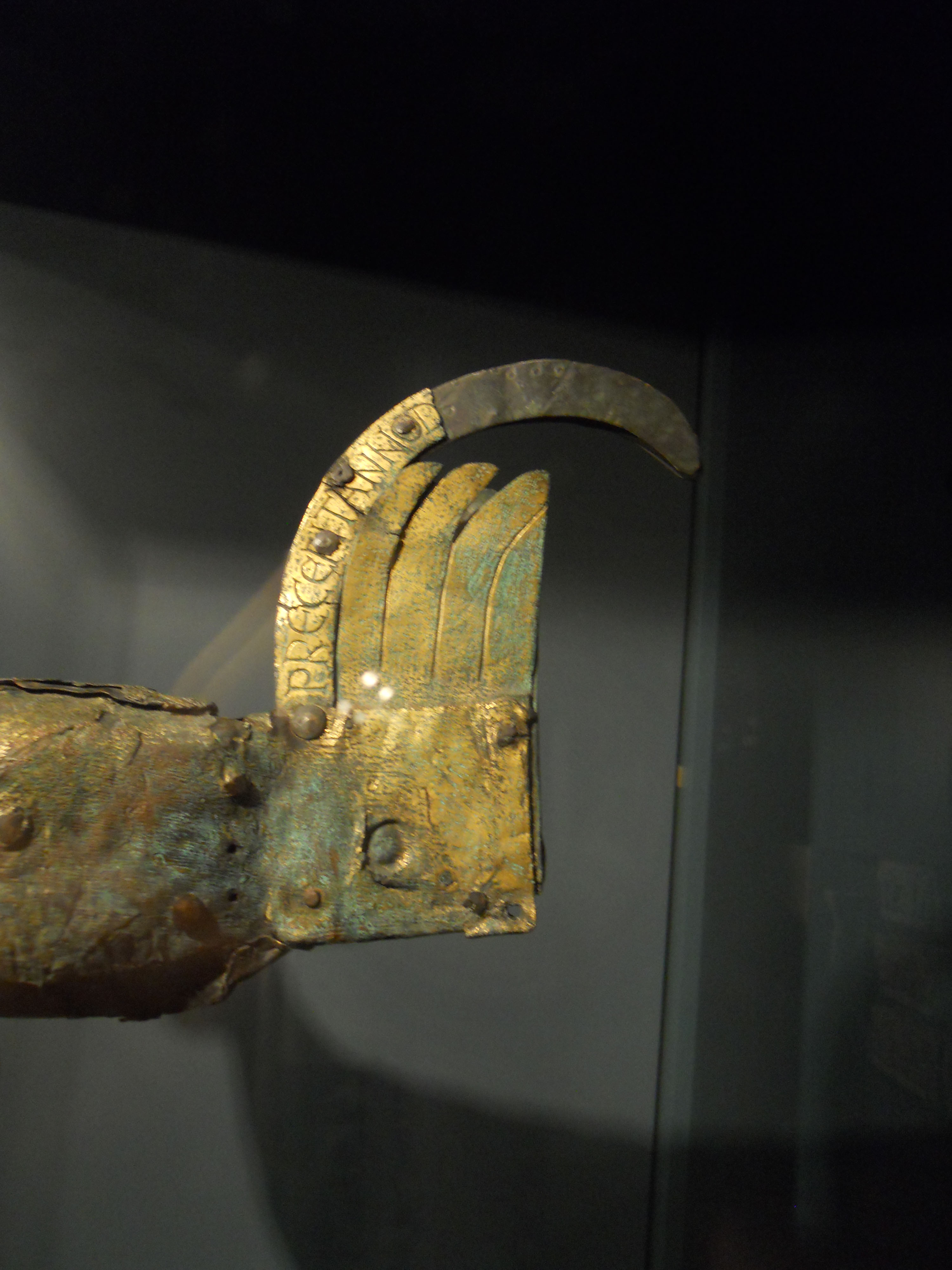
The tail with the remains of the inscription

== Bibliography ==
- Astezati, Gian Andrea (1728). Evangelistae Manelmi Vicentini Commentariolum (de quibusdam gestis in bello gallico) de obsidione Brixiae Anni MCCCCXXXVIII [Commentary of Evangelista Manelmi Vicentini (on certain events in the Gallic War) on the Siege of Brescia in 1438] (in Italian).
- Biemmi, Gian Maria (1748). Istoria di Brescia [History of Brescia] (in Italian).
- Faino, Bernardino (1670). Vita delli Santi fratelli Martiri Faustino et Giovita primi sacrati a Dio [Life of the Holy Martyr Siblings Faustino and Giovita, First Consecrated to God] (in Italian).
- Lauri, Cosimo (1572). "Collectanea Cosmae de Lauris Civis Brixiensis". Catalogus Episcoporum Brixianorum [Catalog of Brescia Bishops] (in Italian).
- Novati, Francesco (1905). Li dis du Koc di Jean de Condé ed il gallo del campanile nella poesia medioevale [The Dis du Koc by Jean de Condé and the Rooster of the Bell Tower in Medieval Poetry] (in Italian).
- Odorici, Federico (1853). Storie Bresciane dai primi tempi sino all'età nostra [Brescian Stories from the Earliest Times to Our Era] (in Italian).
- Prestini, Rossana (1999). Regesto [Register] (in Italian). Brescia: Gruppo Banca Lombarda, La Scuola.
- Prestini, Rossana (1999). Vicende faustiniane [Faustinian Events] (in Italian). Brescia: Gruppo Banca Lombarda, La Scuola.
- Rossi, Ottavio (1624). Historia de' Gloriosissimi Santi Martiri Faustino et Giovita [History of the Most Glorious Martyr Saints Faustino and Giovita] (in Italian).
- Savio, Fedele (1929). Gli antichi vescovi d'Italia. La Lombardia [The Ancient Bishops of Italy. Lombardy] (in Italian).
- Volta, Valentino (1999). Evoluzione edilizia del complesso di San Faustino [Architectural Evolution of the San Faustino Complex] (in Italian). Brescia: Gruppo Banca Lombarda, La Scuola.
