= Earing =

Small line (rope) used to fasten the corner of a sail to a spar or yard

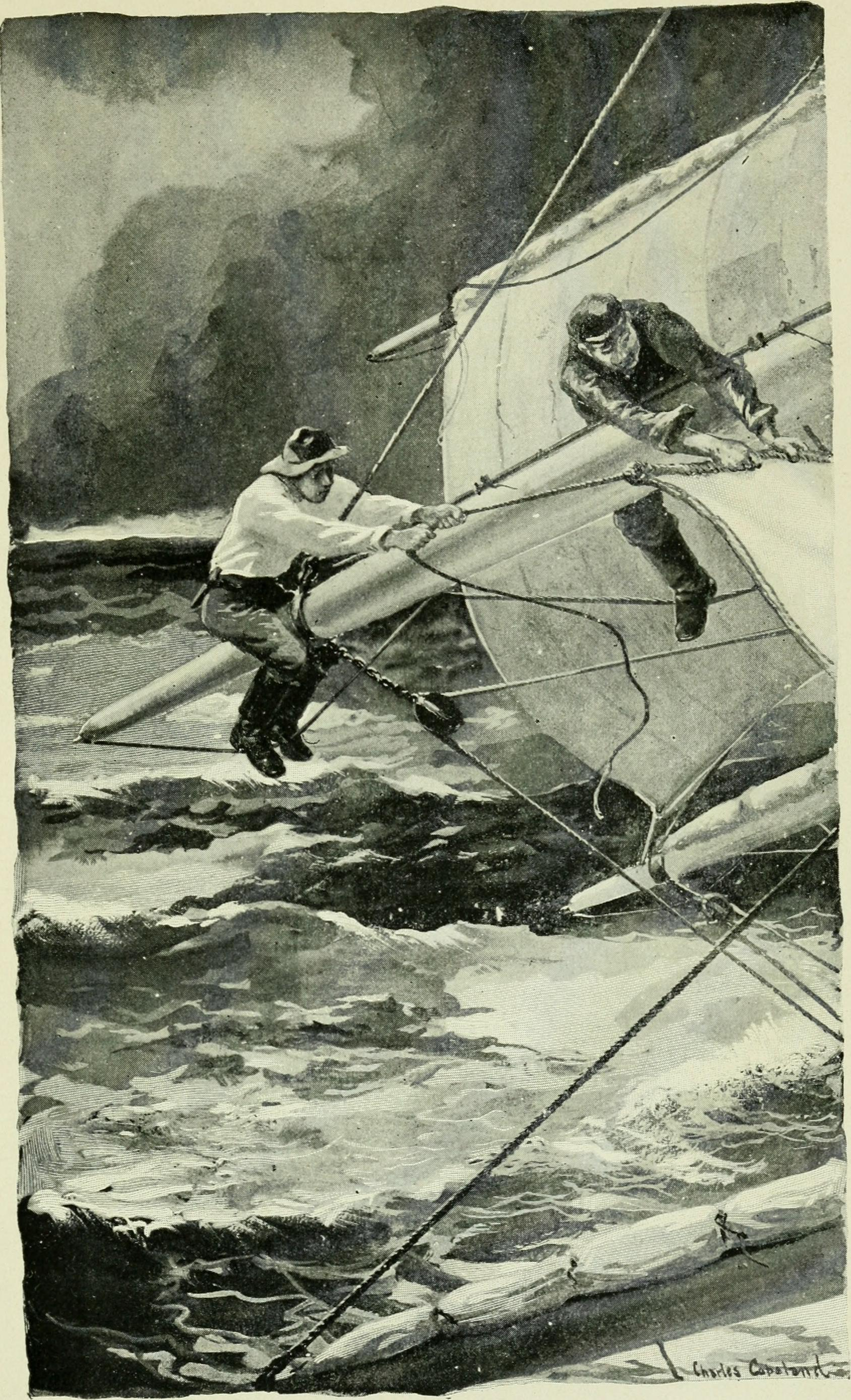
Dog-watches at sea

In sailing, an earing is a small line (rope) used to fasten the corner of a sail to a spar or yard.

== Background ==
In the Age of Sail, a position at the Weather Earing (the earing at the windward side of the ship) was considered a place of honor for the topmen, and on a merchant ship was the position of the second mate during reefing.
