= Boomkicker =

A boomkicker is a modern mechanical device on boats that pushes the boom up by one or more glassfiber rods. If the boom is sheeted in, the rods will bend and produce a force upwards.

This provides several beneficial effects for the sailor. In light air, a boomkicker provides better sail shape by lifting the boom and opening the leech. No topping lift is required when using the boomkicker. As a consequence, reefing is safer and easier with better boom control, and when dropping the mainsail the boom will not hit the deck.

A boomkicker may be installed alongside a traditional block and tackle boom vang, and will work in close collaboration with it. It is not used with a hydraulic, or rigid vang, as that type of vang already performs the function of supporting the boom.

The boomkicker is, among others, widely used on the International Dragon Class.

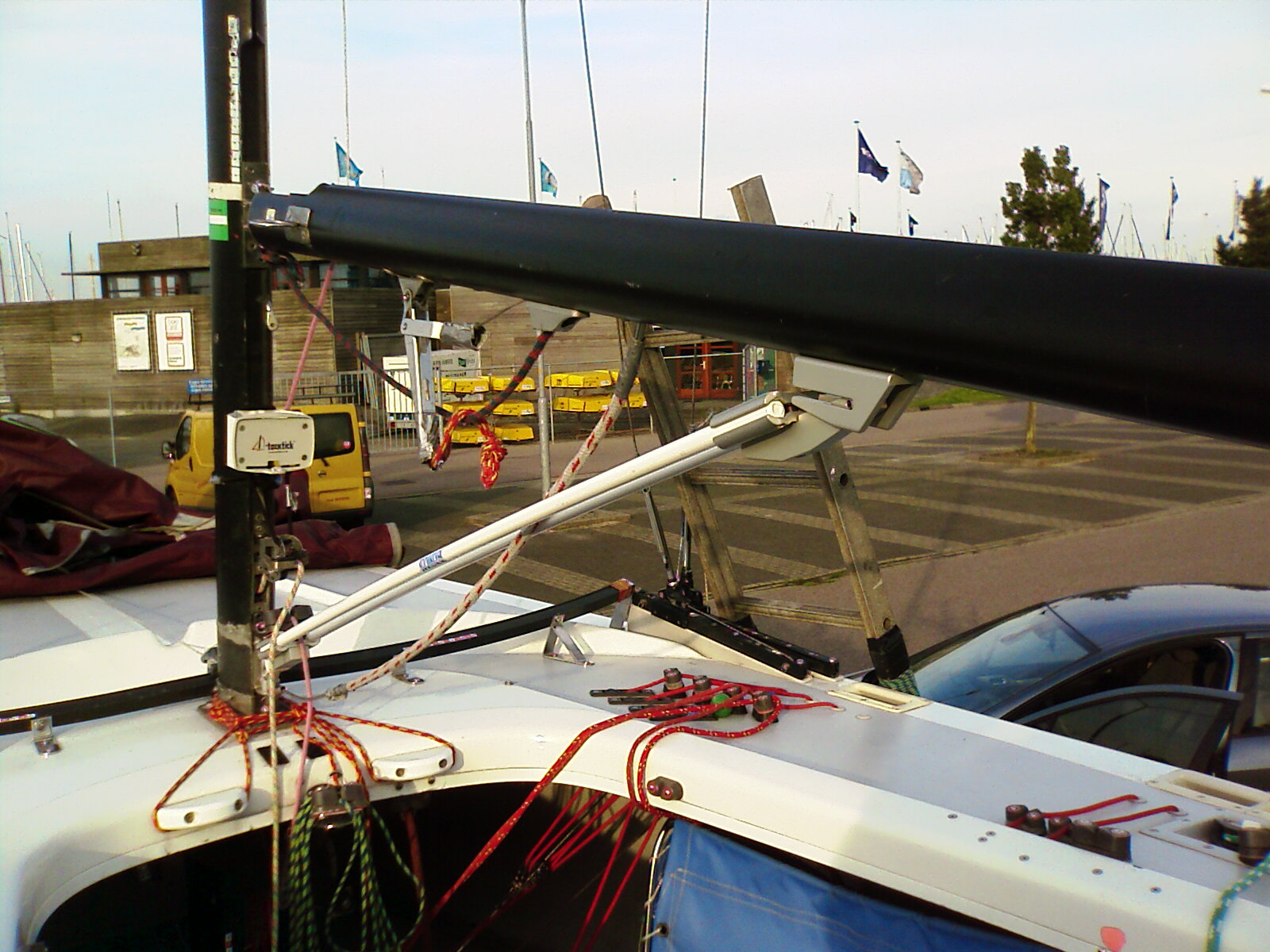
Boomkicker in straight position showed on a Soling

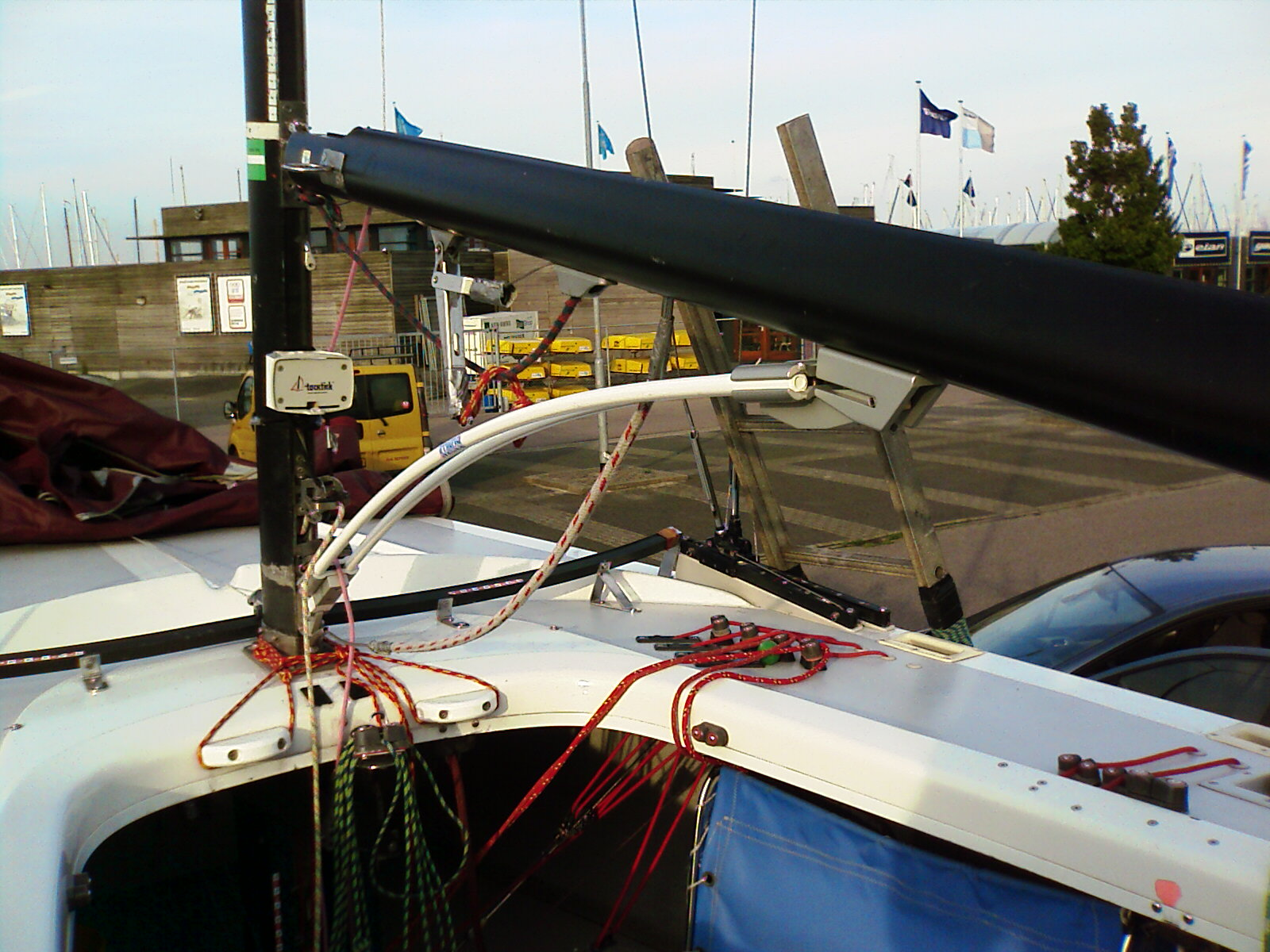
Boomkicker in bent position
