= Fairlead =

Guide for rope, sheet or cable

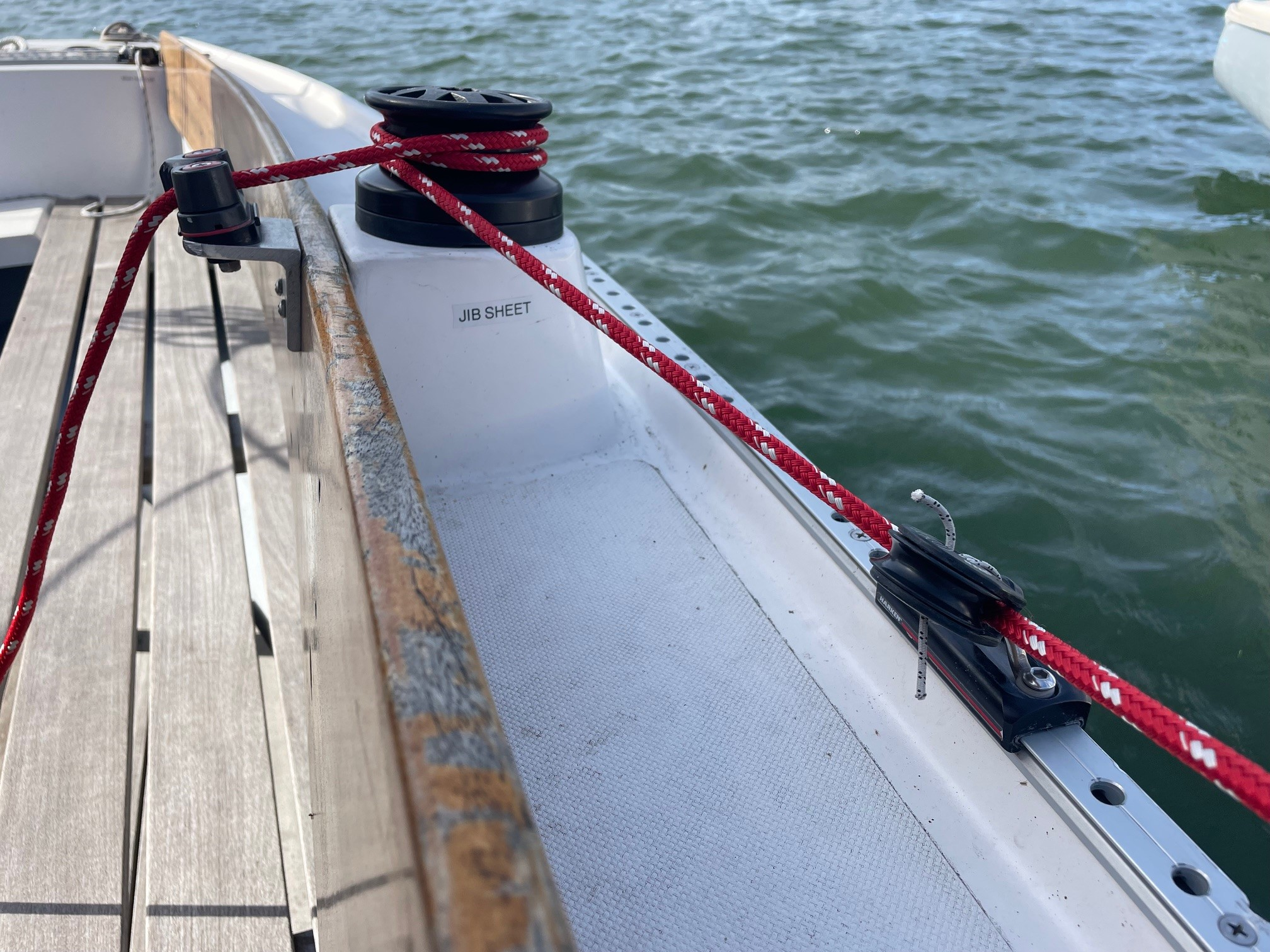
Adjustable fairlead (lower right) leading to winch on sailboat

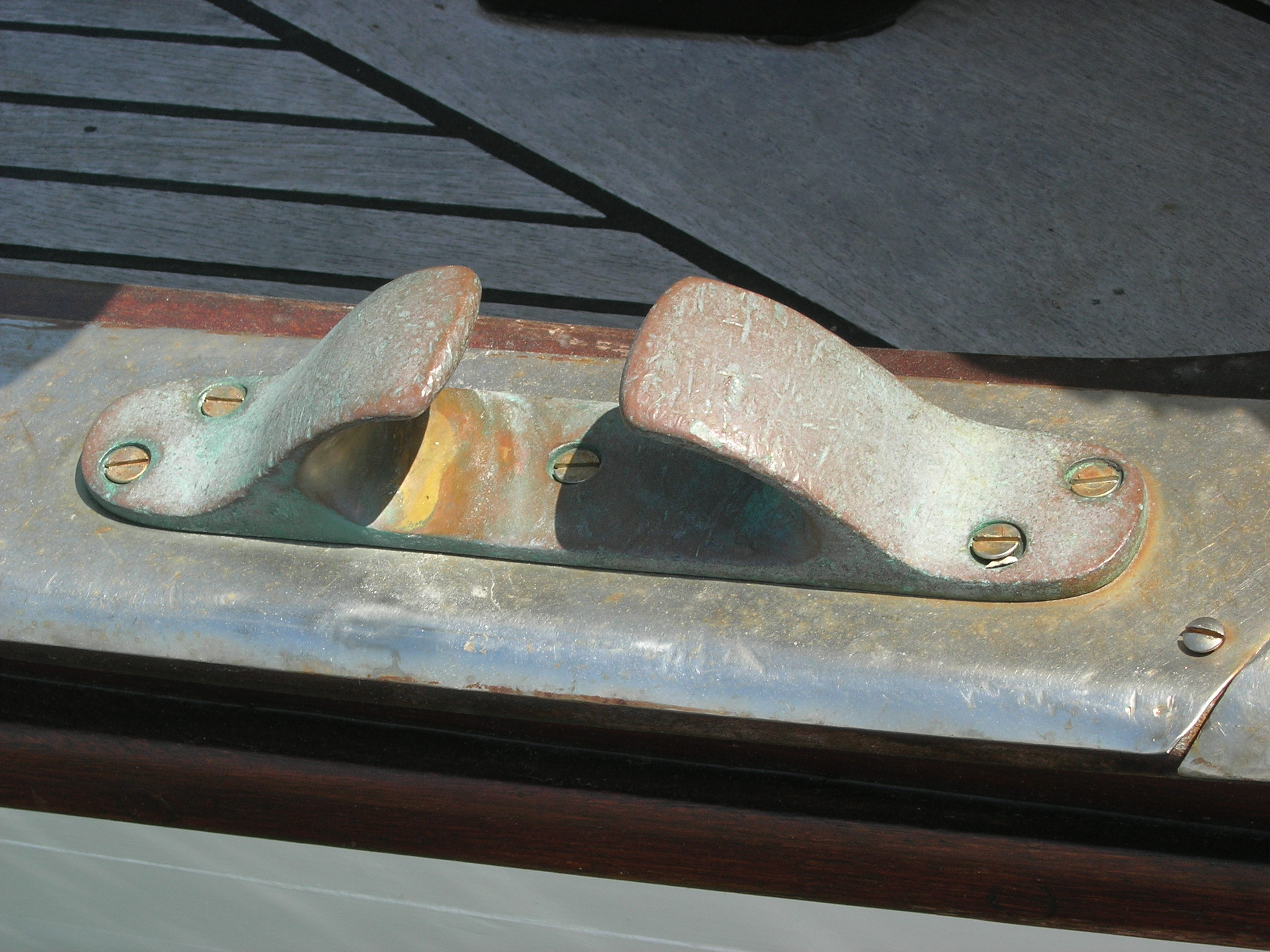
Fairlead (Chock style)

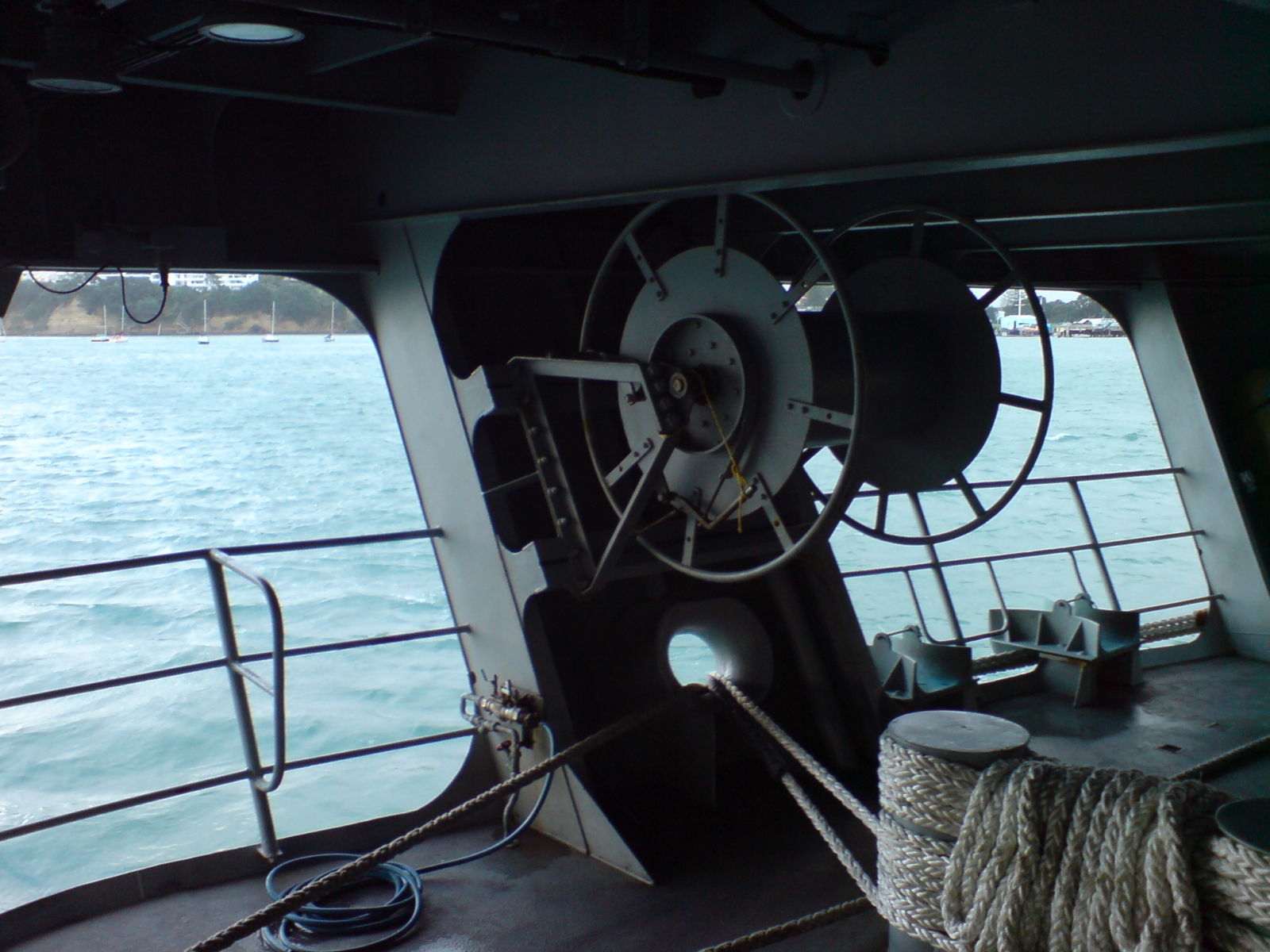
Three mooring lines (hawsers) running through fairlead on a Royal New Zealand Navy ship.

A fairlead is a turning point for running rigging like rope, chain, wire or line, that guides that line such that the "lead" is "fair", and therefore low friction and low chafe. A fairlead can be a hook, ring, pulley, chock, padeye, or hawse (hole) sometimes surrounded by rollers.

If the line is meant to be moved while in the fairlead, the angle in the line created by the fairlead must be shallow to minimize friction. For larger angles a block or pulley is used as a fairlead to reduce friction. Where the line is removed from a hook fairlead before using, the angle is not an issue.

A fairlead can also be used to stop a straight run of line from vibrating or rubbing on another surface.

Fairleads are used on most sailboats. Even a simple Sunfish sailboat has two fairleads. A ring fairlead holds the halyard parallel to the mast so its cleat can be located near to the cockpit. On models without a deck block for the sheet, a hook fairlead in the forward edge of the cockpit gives the sailor options when handling the sheet.

When attached to a track to make its position adjustable, a fairlead leading a jibsheet to a winch can be moved fore, aft and sometimes side to side to allow a sailor to tune sail trim to wind conditions. In this duty, angle of the fairlead determines the depth of the sail, height of the clew, leach tension and other sail trim variables.

While fairleads are most frequently found in nautical or sailing applications, they can be found anywhere rigging is used. For example, in off-roading, a fairlead is used to guide the winch cable and remove lateral strain from the winch. A roller fairlead is used with steel cable and a hawse fairlead is used with synthetic cable.

An example of hook fairlead can be seen on buildings with an angled flagstaff mounted over a door. At the base of the flagstaff is usually a hook so the flag halyard can be held parallel to the pole, and still tied off to a cleat beside the door, rather than above.
