= Lazy jack =

Type of sail rigging

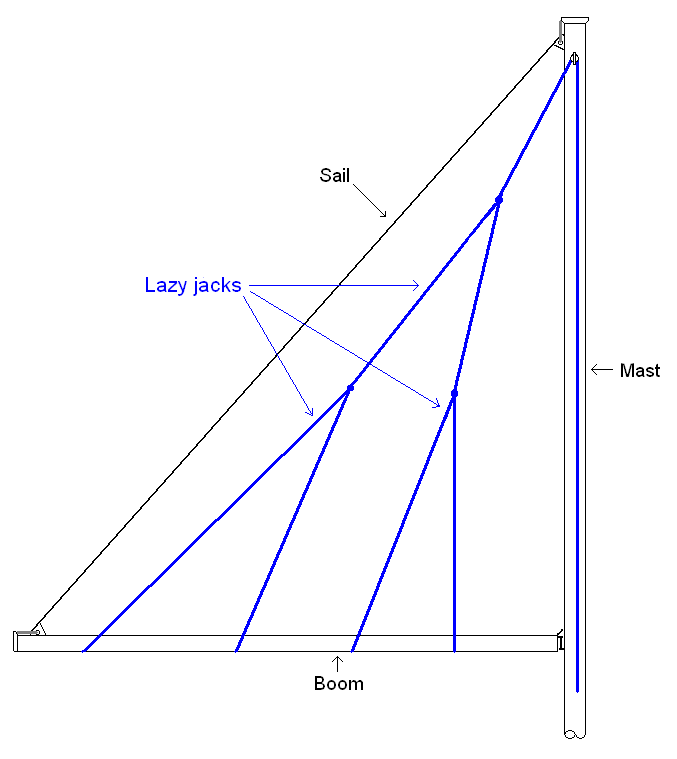
typical application of lazy jacks to a leg-of-mutton mainsail

Lazy jacks (or lazyjacks) are a type of rigging which can be applied to a fore-and-aft rigged sail to assist in sail handling during reefing and furling. They consist of a network of cordage which is rigged to a point on the mast and to a series of points on either side of the boom; these lines form a cradle which helps to guide the sail onto the boom when it is lowered, reducing the crew needed to secure the sail. Lazy jacks are most commonly associated with Bermuda rigged sails, although they can be used with gaff rigged sails and with club-footed jibs. Blocks and rings may be part of some lazyjacks.

The oyster dredging sailboats of the Chesapeake Bay, bugeyes and skipjacks, were invariably equipped with lazy jacks, as their huge sail plans, combined with the changeable conditions on the bay, made it necessary to be able to reef quickly and with a small crew. Of late they have been revived as a feature of pleasure yachts as an alternative to roller reefing and furling. The latter methods can distort the sail, and are not compatible with battens in the reefed or furled portion of the sail. Lazy jacks are also cheaper, and can be easily applied after-market. However, they are not without disadvantages. The extra lines provide something else for the sail to foul upon when it is being raised, particularly if it is battened, and the lines and the connections between them can chafe and beat upon the sail, shortening its life and making unwanted noise. Also, unlike the roller systems, some crew member(s) must be on deck to secure the sail.

It is generally claimed that the name has its origins in the colloquial reference to British sailors as "Jack tars". "Lazy jacks" would therefore point to reduction of manpower and effort that lazy jacks provide.
