= Bolt rope =

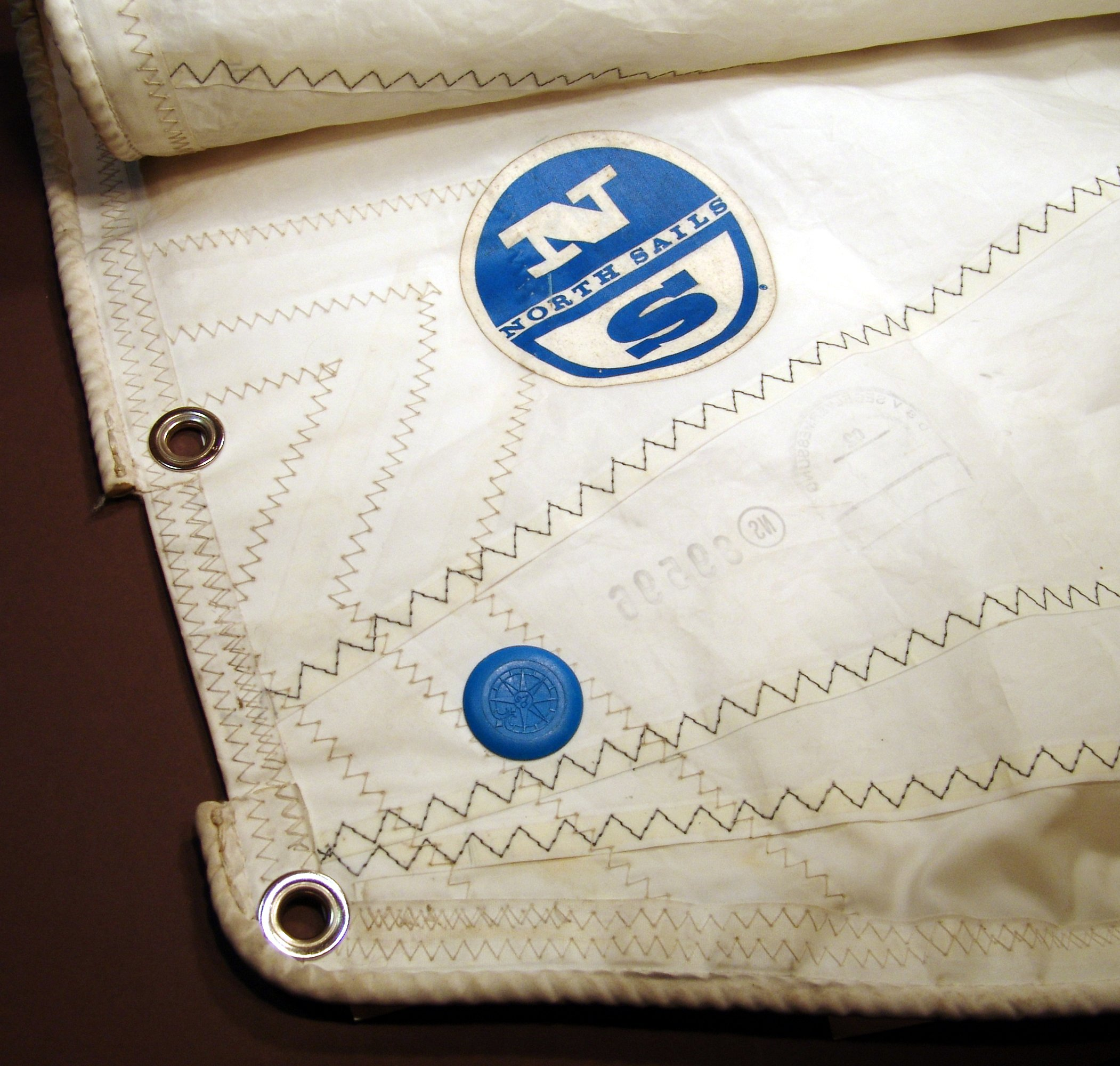
Sail detail at the tack (lower corner of the leading edge) of a mainsail, showing bolt ropes in the luff and foot. Bolt ropes may extend to other parts of a sail, as well.

A bolt rope (Variants: "bolt-rope" and "boltrope", French: ralingue, Spanish: relinga, Old Norse: *rár-línk, comprising rár genitive of rá "rope" and línk "edge of a sail "), is the rope that is sewn at the edges of the sail to reinforce them, or to fix the sail into a groove in the boom or in the mast.

Fore-and-aft sails often have bolt ropes on the leading edge (luff) where they attach to the mast and the bottom edge (foot) where they attach to the boom, which provide the terms, "luff bolt rope" and "foot bolt rope". They also occur on the edges of sails suspended from a spar, such as for gaff, square and lateen rigs.

== Attachment and characteristics ==
Sail construction detail (tack corner), showing a metal bolt rope (2) in the luff and a fiber bolt rope (3) in the foot

Bolt ropes were described as early as 1847, when Robert Kipping addressed "bolt-rope" attachment for a variety of sails, using sewing techniques appropriate to each, in his book, The Elements of Sailmaking. He addressed the tradeoff between stiffness and flexibility to provide reinforcement without distorting the intended shape of the sail. He emphasized the need for the bolt rope not to affect the degree of slack on the leech (trailing edge) of a sail. He further emphasized that the rope must retain its original twist, as it is sewn in place, to avoid distorting the edge of the sail. He observed that, "Many a well-cut sail is spoiled by the roping."

== See also ==
- Rigging
- Sail components
- Glossary of nautical terms (disambiguation)
