= Reefing =

Reducing the area of a sail

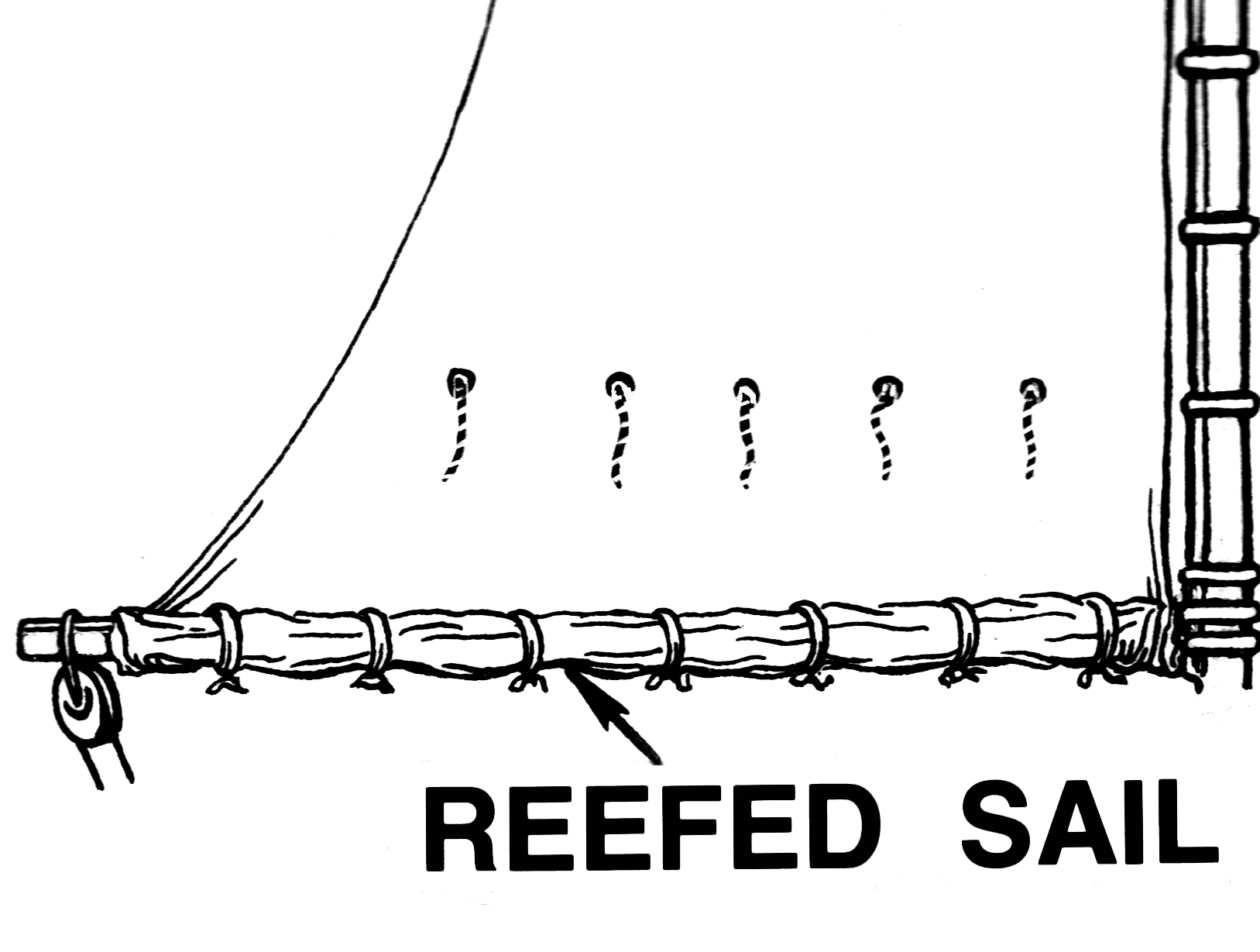
Reefed Sail

Gaff sail, showing reefing cringles (13), reefing points (20) and reefing lines (21)

In sailing, reefing is the practice of reducing the area of a sail to preserve a sailing vessel's stability in strong winds. This is usually achieved by folding or rolling one edge of the canvas in on itself and attaching the unused portion to a spar or a stay. Restoring full sail area is termed shaking out a reef.

Whereas fore-and-aft rigged vessels store the unused portion of the sail on a boom (below the sail), square-rigged vessels stow the unused portion on a spar above the sail. Reefing may occur by rolling the sail around its luff or foot, either on a rotating stay or within a spar.

== Fore-and-aft rigs ==
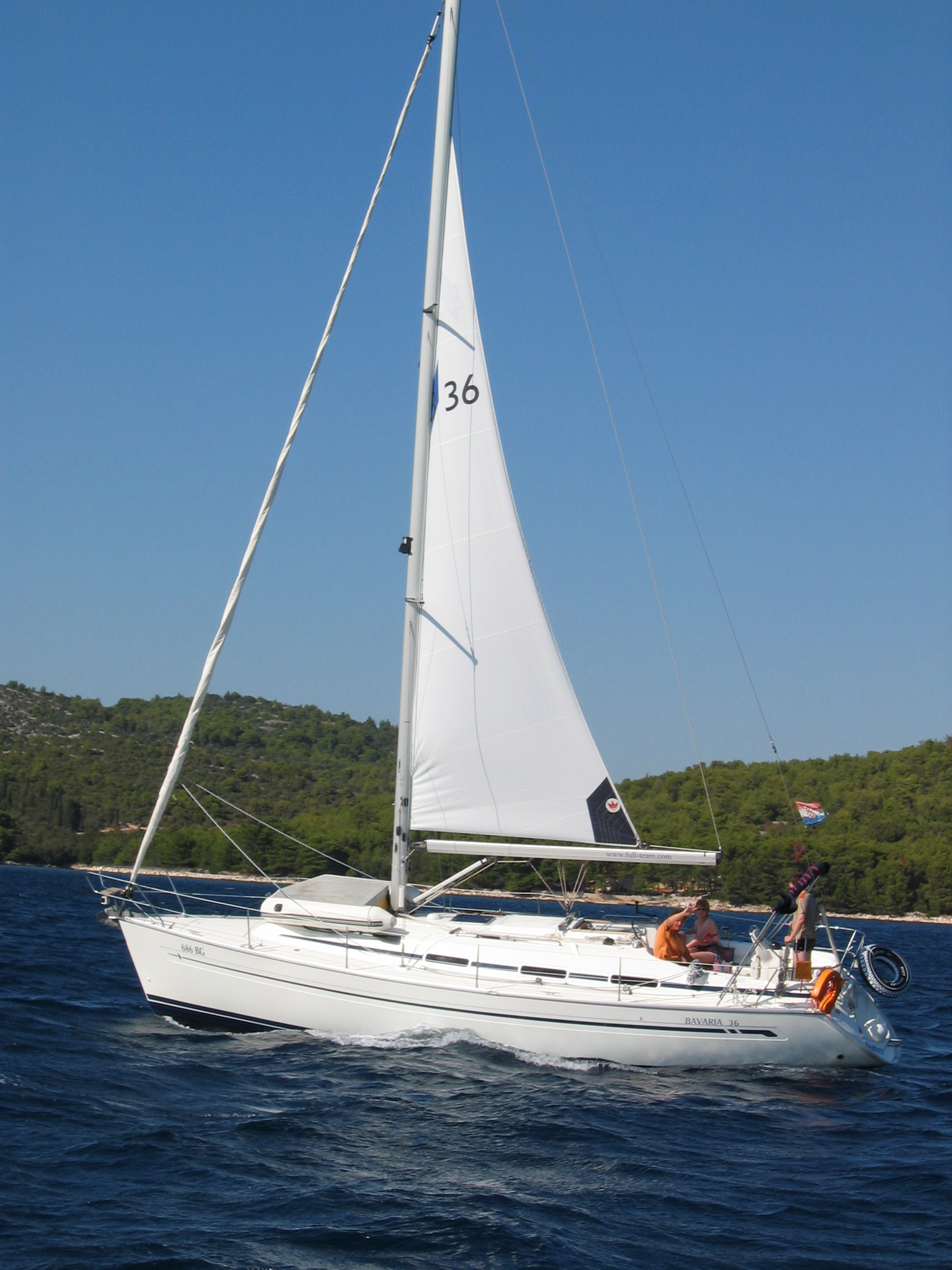
A genoa jib completely furled around the forestay, and mainsail partially furled within the mast (forming a reef) on a Bavaria 36 sloop

Sails may have built-in alternative attachment points that allow their area to be reduced. In a mainsail, reefing cringles may be installed in the sail; a cruising boat will typically have two to three pairs. These are pulled down to the boom to form a new tack and clew, reducing the sail's area. The first pair closest to the boom is called a single reef, the next pair is called a double reef, and so on. A sail usually has eyelets at the same level as the reefing cringles. These are used with reefing points (short lengths of small rope either permanently or temporarily fed through the sail) to secure the excess fabric of the sail after reefing; the points are passed under the foot of the sail or round the boom and tied with a reef knot . Alternatively, a reefing line can be fed through all the eyelets and round the foot of the sail. This keeps the wind out of the unused part of the sails and may improve visibility.

=== Slab ===
Slab or jiffy reefing allows for the quick establishment of a new tack and clew, while the halyard is partially lowered and then raised. One or two reefing lines passing through the sail's luff and leach reef cringles create a new tack and clew for the sail by pulling them tight to the boom. These can be led back to the cockpit to allow crew members to reef without going on deck in heavy weather. Intermediate reef cringles need not be used.

=== Roller ===
Roller reefing rolls or wraps the sail around a wire, foil, or spar to reduce its exposure to the wind. In mainsail furling systems the sail is either wrapped around the boom by a mechanism in the gooseneck or hardware inside the boom winds it around a rotating foil. Furling systems controlled with lines led to the cockpit allow reefing without crew having to go on deck in heavy weather. Roller reefing also allows more variable sail area than conventional or jiffy reefing. Countering these advantages are the furled sail possibly not having an optimal shape and sail repair or replacement being more difficult. In-mast roller-furling mainsails are not conducive to good sail shape.

== Square rigs ==
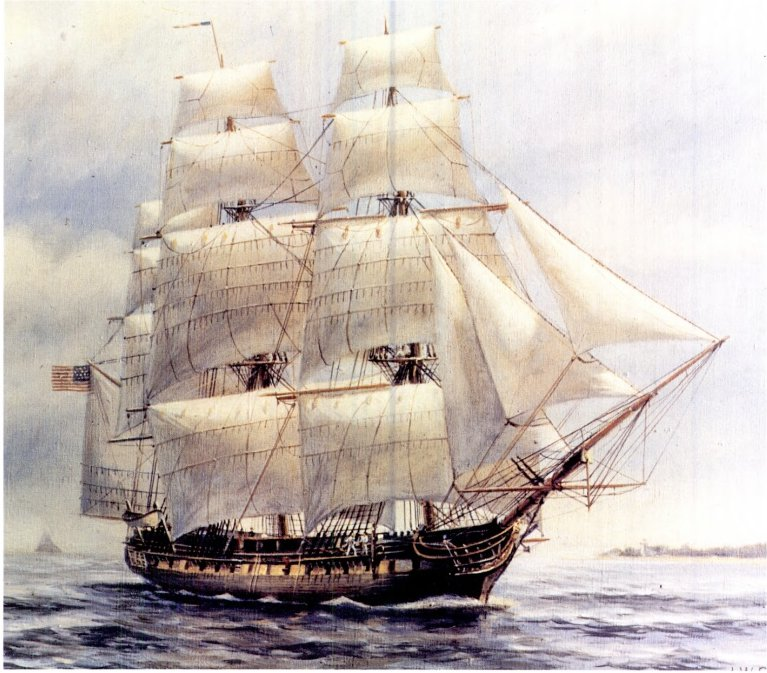
Square-rigged, 18th-century frigate, showing reef bands across the sails.

Square-rigged sails hang from a spar, called a yard. When reefed, the sail is pulled upwards and affixed to the yard at one of the reef bands that runs horizontally across the sail. Each reef band is a canvas-reinforced strip, which contains cringles—eyes through which the reefing points (short pieces of rope) pass that attach the sail to the yard. A sail may have several reef bands to shorten sail to different degrees.

== History ==
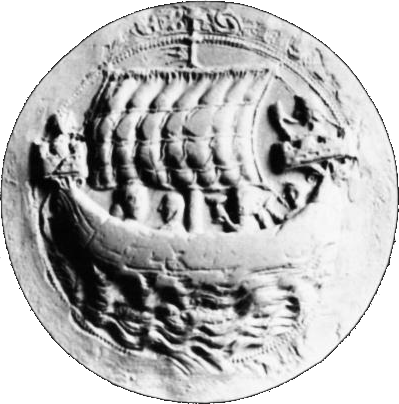
Reef points shown on the Dublin City seal, 1297

The earliest known depiction of reef points is on the Dublin City Seal of 1297. The earliest surviving example of reef points is on the sail for a ship's boat found on the wreck of Vasa, which sank in 1628. Vasa's own sails included ones which had bonnets. These are extra pieces that fasten to the bottom of a sail to increase its area. These were attached for lighter winds and removed in higher winds. This was the common method of adjusting sail area to match wind strength during the latter part of Medieval period, with the first mention of this technique in 1350. Other evidence of use of bonnets has been found on the Mary Rose. Reefing started to be used again on square rigged ships in the latter part of the seventeenth century, first appearing on topsails c. 1660, and being used on courses somewhat later.

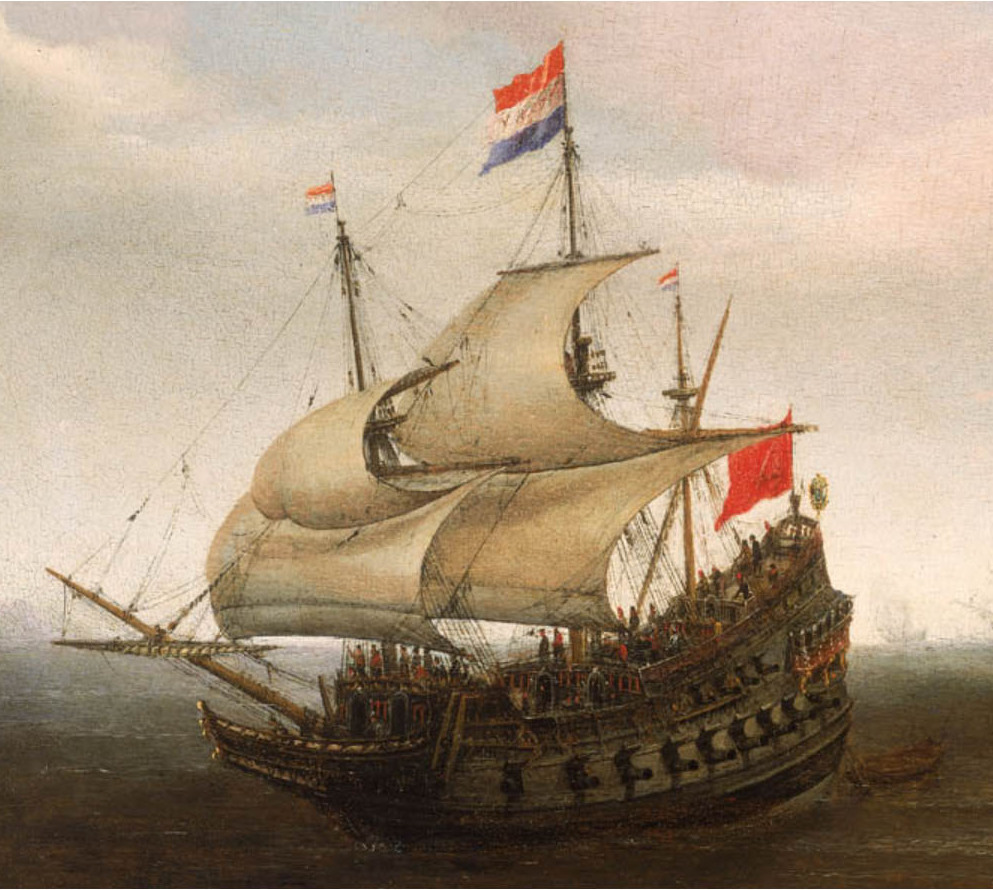
An early 16th century painting, showing the "half-masting" of the topsails as a response to stronger winds

In the first half of the sixteenth century, another action in stronger winds was to "half mast" the topsails. This involved partially lowering the topsails, which reduced the amount of drive they produced. With the sail lower down the topmast, the forces generated were lower down the mast, so putting less tension in the backstays. (Note: This method of operating this version of square rig has been demonstrated in the replica of Duyfken, with the technique based on, among other things, extensive research of the paintings of ships from this era. The term "half mast" is used by John Narborough, his precise usage being, for example: "it blew so hard that we could not carry out our lower tier of guns, nor our topsails above half mast up.")

== See also ==
- Brail
- Glossary of nautical terms (M-Z)
