= Cunningham (sailing) =

Type of downhaul

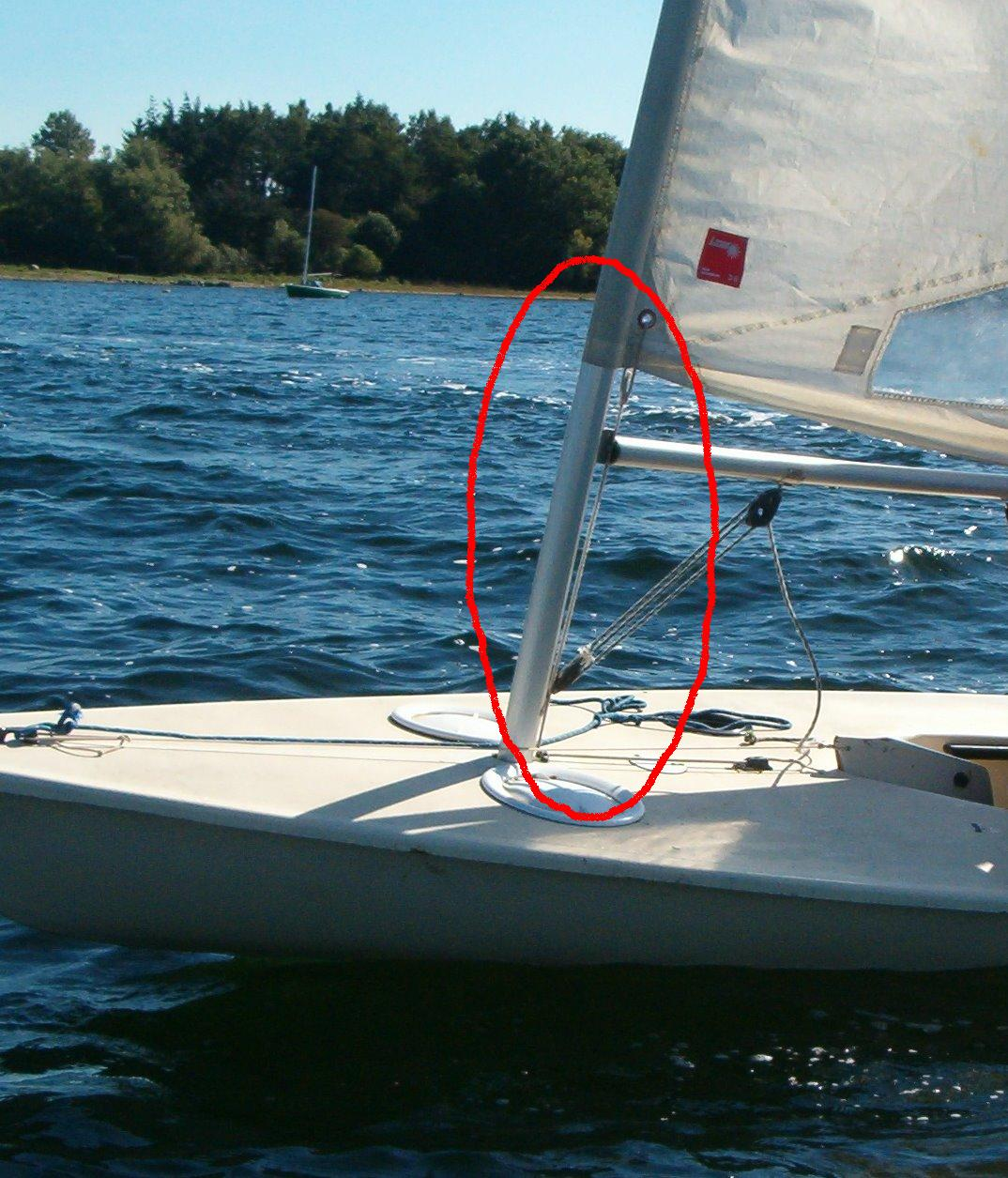
Cunningham downhaul

In sailing, a cunningham or cunningham's eye is a type of downhaul used on a Bermuda rigged sailboat to change the shape of a sail. It is named after its inventor, Briggs Cunningham, a victorious America's Cup skipper and yacht builder.

The cunningham differs from a typical downhaul in the way that it attaches to the sail. The system usually consists of a line which is secured at one end to the mast or boom below the foot of the mainsail. It is then passed through a cringle in the luff of the sail near the foot but above the tack, and then led down on the other side to a fitting on the mast, boom or on deck.

The tension in the luff of the sail is adjusted using a combination of the halyard and the cunningham (where fitted). The primary advantage of adjusting the cunningham is the speed and ease with which the luff tension can be changed while sailing or racing. By either hauling or easing the line, the tension in the luff can be changed, thereby shifting the point of maximum draft of the sail forward or aft respectively, optimizing sail shape and thus performance. It is a fine control which is used more frequently on racing sailboats than on cruising or day-sailing boats.
