= Jib =

Triangular sail that sets ahead of the foremast

A jib is a triangular sail that sets ahead of the foremast of a sailing vessel. Its forward corner (tack) is fixed to the bowsprit, to the bows, or to the deck between the bowsprit and the foremost mast. Jibs and spinnakers are the two main types of headsails on a modern boat.

== Modern yachts and small craft ==
A jib, left, compared to a genoa, right. The foretriangle is outlined in red.

Boats may be sailed using a jib alone, but more commonly jibs make a minor direct contribution to propulsion compared to a main sail. Generally, a jib's most crucial function is as an airfoil, increasing performance and overall stability by reducing turbulence on the main sail's leeward side.

On boats with only one jib, it is common for the clew of the jib to be abaft the mast, meaning the jib and mainsail overlap. An overlapping jib is called a genoa jib or simply a genoa (see illustration). These are efficiently used when reaching more broadly than a close reach. Alternatively, a boat may carry smaller jibs, to compensate aerodynamics when the main sail is reefed; these more rugged sails are called storm jibs or spitfires.

On a boat with two staysails the inner sail is called the staysail, and the outer (foremost) is called the jib. This combination of two staysails is called a cutter rig (or in North America a yankee pair) and a boat with one mast rigged with two staysails and a mainsail is called a cutter.

On cruising yachts, and nearly all racing sailboats, the jib needs to be worked when tacking. On these yachts, there are two sheets attached to the clew of the jib. As the yacht comes head to wind during a tack, the active sheet is released, and the other sheet (the lazy sheet) on the other side of the boat is pulled in. This sheet becomes the new active sheet until the next tack.

== Traditional vessels ==
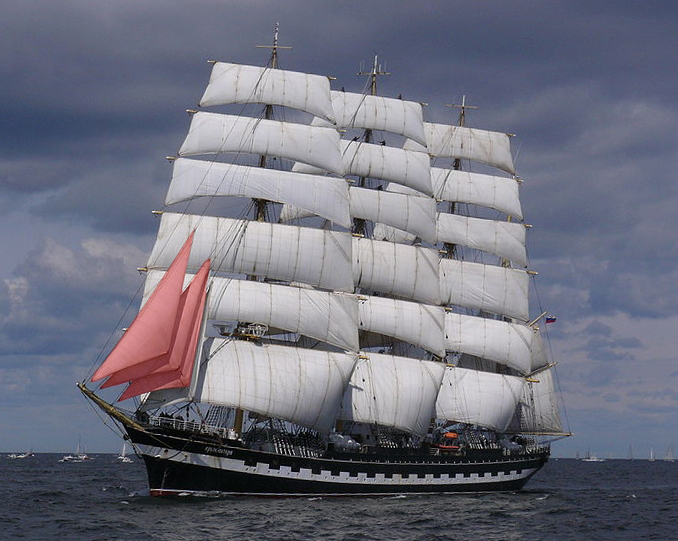
Three of the four jibs are in pink.

Schooners typically have up to three jibs. The foremost one sets on the topmast forestay and is generally called the outer jib, a second on the main forestay is called the inner jib, and the innermost is called the staysail or fore staysail. Actually, all three sails are staysails in the generic sense.

Original usage in 18th and 19th century square-rigged ships distinguished between the fore staysail, set on the forestay running from the foremast head to the ship's peak, the foremost part of the hull, and the jibs set on stays running to the bowsprit. Jibs, but not staysails, could also be "set flying," i.e. not attached to the standing rigging. Sails set beyond the peak were typically called jibs, set on stays running from the fore topmast to the bowsprit, or the fore topgallant mast to the jibboom or even the fore royal mast to the flying jibboom. A large square-rigged ship typically has four jibs, but could have as many as six.

From forward to aft, these sails are called:

- Jib of jibs
- Spindle jib
- Flying jib
- Outer jib
- Inner jib
- Fore (topmast) staysail.

The first two were rarely used except by clipper ships in light winds and were usually set flying. A storm jib was a small jib of heavy canvas set to a stay to help to control the ship in bad weather.

== Idiom ==
The jib is referenced in the idiom usually spoken as "I like the cut of your jib", generally seen as signifying approval of one's general appearance or respect for their character. The phrase alludes to the maritime practice of identifying far-away ships by noting the "cut" (general shape and configuration) of their sails to determine their status as friend or foe. One such report from the Naval Chronicle (1805)—"we perceived by the cut of their sails, then set, that they were French Ships of War"—is often cited as an early inspiration for the idiom.

Sir Walter Scott used the expression to denote approval in the 1824 novel St. Ronan's Well: "If she disliked what the sailor calls the cut of their jib". John Russell Bartlett later defined the idiom in his 1848 Dictionary of Americanisms as "The form of his profile, the cast of his countenance". This usage alludes to a frequent variation of meaning which describes approval, specifically, of the shape of one's nose, which roughly approximates the frontal position and triangular shape of the jib sail on a boat.

== See also ==
- Lateen sail
- Sail plan
