= Bonnet (sail) =

Part of a sail

A bonnet is an additional part of a sail which is laced to the bottom, or foot. It is joined to the main part of the sail with lacings (called latchings). Latchings can be undone very quickly, so allowing rapid removal of sail area. Their purpose is to provide additional sail area for lighter winds. This contrasts with the process of reefing, where sail area is taken out of use in stronger winds by fastening up or rolling away a region of the sail.

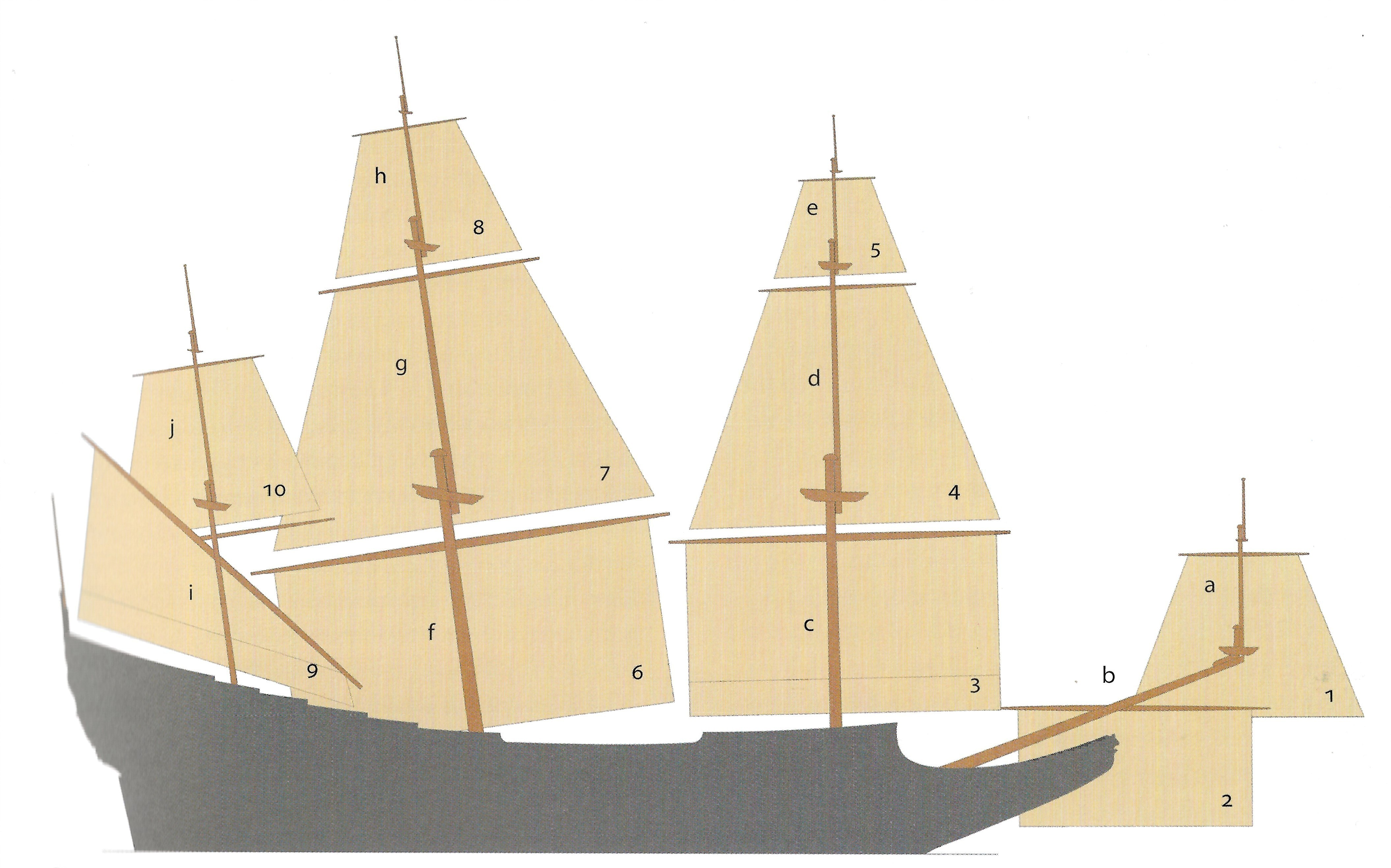
The sail plan of Vasa, showing the bonnets laced to the bottom of the fore course (3) and the mizzen (9)

In some cases, another, extra section of sail is added below the bonnet, essentially a second bonnet. This second addition is called a drabbler.

Any of the lower sails could be fitted with a bonnet. A common arrangement in a full rigged ship of the early seventeenth century was to have a bonnet on the fore course (the lowest square sail on the foremast) and the mizzen (the lateen sail on the aftermost mast). This is the arrangement found on Vasa.

Bonnets were used on square-rigged vessels from c. 1350 (Note: The first mention of bonnets in English sources is 1350, with wide adoption by 1370) and continued in use on square sails until the second half of the seventeenth century. They were also used on fore-and-aft sails. Contemporary with this use on square sails, bonnets occurred on the lateen mizzen sails of the first half of the seventeenth century. However, fore-and-aft usage continued much later than that. Examples of this include the staysail, mainsail and mizzen of ketch rigged sailing drifters of the nineteenth century and cargo carrying river craft, such as the Norfolk Wherry, where use of a bonnet allowed the sail to clear a deck cargo. These examples of bonnet use existed alongside other craft that used reefing. It was not unknown for a bonnet and reefing points to be found on the same vessel on different sails.

Much of the knowledge of bonnets being used on square sails comes from iconography and written accounts. The only surviving example of a largely complete bonnet from the seventeenth century is the mizzen of Vasa. The sailing of the Duyfken replica was based on extensive iconographic and documentary research on how such a ship should be handled. This showed that the bonnets were left in place for most of the time, and their removal was the last sail reduction made in rising winds.
