= Boom brake =

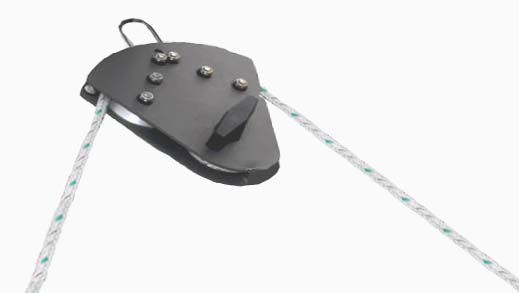
Boom brake with line. The brake shackles to the bottom of the boom, and the line attaches to the base of the shrouds; tensioning the line actuates the brake.

A boom brake is a device designed to control the swing of the boom on a sailboat. The boom brake acts as a preventer when sailing downwind, and can also be used to jibe(US) or gybe(UK) the mainsail in a slow measured action.

Uncontrolled jibes often damage elements of the rig, and can inflict serious and sometimes fatal injuries to crew in the path of the boom or the mainsheet and associated hardware.

The brake usually rides on a line running perpendicular to the boom; when the boom brake is actuated, it grabs the line and either works as a preventer, or slows the boom's speed while jibing. The brake is actuated by either tensioning the line upon which it rides or using a second line to tension the brake relative to the main line.
