= Preventer =

Sailing rope to stop accidental jibes

A gybe preventer, preventer, or jibe-guard, is a mechanical device on a sailing vessel which limits the boom's ability to swing unexpectedly across the boat due to an unplanned accidental jibe.

During an unplanned accidental jibe (or gybe), neither the crew nor the boat is set up properly to execute a planned jibe. As a result, the uncontrolled boom will swing across the boat potentially inflicting injury or knocking crew members overboard. The mainsheet or traveller can also inflict serious injury. Uncontrolled jibes may also damage the boat itself.

Rigging a preventer on a yacht's mainsail is often performed when the wind is behind the beam (i.e. when it's coming from more than 90° off the bow). It can also be useful at other times when there is more swell than wind, a situation when the wind may not have the strength to keep the boom in place as the boat dips and rolls.

On any boat that is sailing downwind without a preventer, strict 'heads-down' procedures must be enforced anywhere within the boom's arc. Certain areas of the side-decks and maybe the cockpit also have to be strictly 'no-go' to all crew depending on what the boom and mainsheet could do in unchecked full swing.

The preventer with the most mechanical advantage is a line, from the end of the boom, led outside the shrouds and a long way forward - perhaps right up to the bow - through a block, back to the cockpit and secured within reach of the mainsheet.

Many cruising sailors prefer to rig two tackles (port and starboard) that run from the midpoint of the boom to blocks on a track such as the headsail-sheet-block track. These tackles are typically a 2 - 4 part tackles for greater purchase. This rig can also be used as a boom vang without taking up space under the mast that may be essential to the cruising sailor for dinghy stowage and other uses. There is a possibility of breaking the main boom with a preventer rig such as this, but many modern yachts are considered to have short enough booms and be beamy enough to overlook this possibility in normal use. For example, while running with the preventer cleated, a large swell could roll the boat, dipping the boom end into the water, snapping the boom in half.

Care should be taken when selecting the rope which is used for preventer lines. To reduce the shock loads on the tackles, for example in an unexpected jibe, three-strand nylon line may be preferred over braided cored line.

== Boom Brake ==
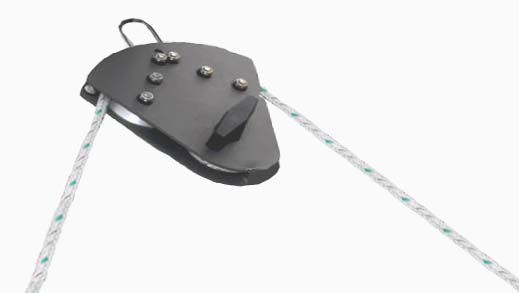
Boom brake with line. The brake shackles to the bottom of the boom, and the line attaches to the base of the shrouds. Tensioning the line actuates the brake.

Another form of preventer is the boom brake, which, when sailing downwind, can also be used to jibe the mainsail in a slow, measured action. The brake usually rides on a line running perpendicular to, and below the boom. When the boom brake is actuated, friction on the line either works as a preventer (stops the boom from moving in the direction that would slacken the main sheet), or slows the boom's speed while jibing. The brake is actuated by either tensioning the line upon which it rides or by using a second line to adjust the brake itself.

== Jibing ==
When jibing a fully loaded mainsail in a following sea, the following procedure may be used. Using the steering, the stern of the boat is carefully brought up into the wind. Then the leeward, working preventer is released little by little, while the mainsheet is shortened to bring in the boom. It is important to maintain at least a turn or two around the preventer's cleat the whole time ready to catch an early jibe during this stage of the manoeuvre. The mainsheet should pull the preventer around its cleat, without it being offered any slack. All the while it is also necessary to take in slack on the lazy preventer to keep it under control (i.e. prevent it getting tangled around something) until it is needed.

When the boom is as near as possible to midships (near to running fore-and-aft along the boat's centreline), the working preventer is slackened, the lazy one tightened, and the mainsheet made very secure. It is important that all crew are safe from where the boom may swing, and a call of "Jibe-ho" is a traditional last warning for this. At this point, a slight steering adjustment will actually jibe the sail. The course of the boat may slew further than expected, which can be ignored as it gives a shorthanded crew time to do the next three things: Run out the mainsheet as fast as possible without burning the hands, ensuring that the newly-lazy preventer runs free, then tighten in and secure the newly working preventer.
