= Outhaul =

Control line found on sailboats

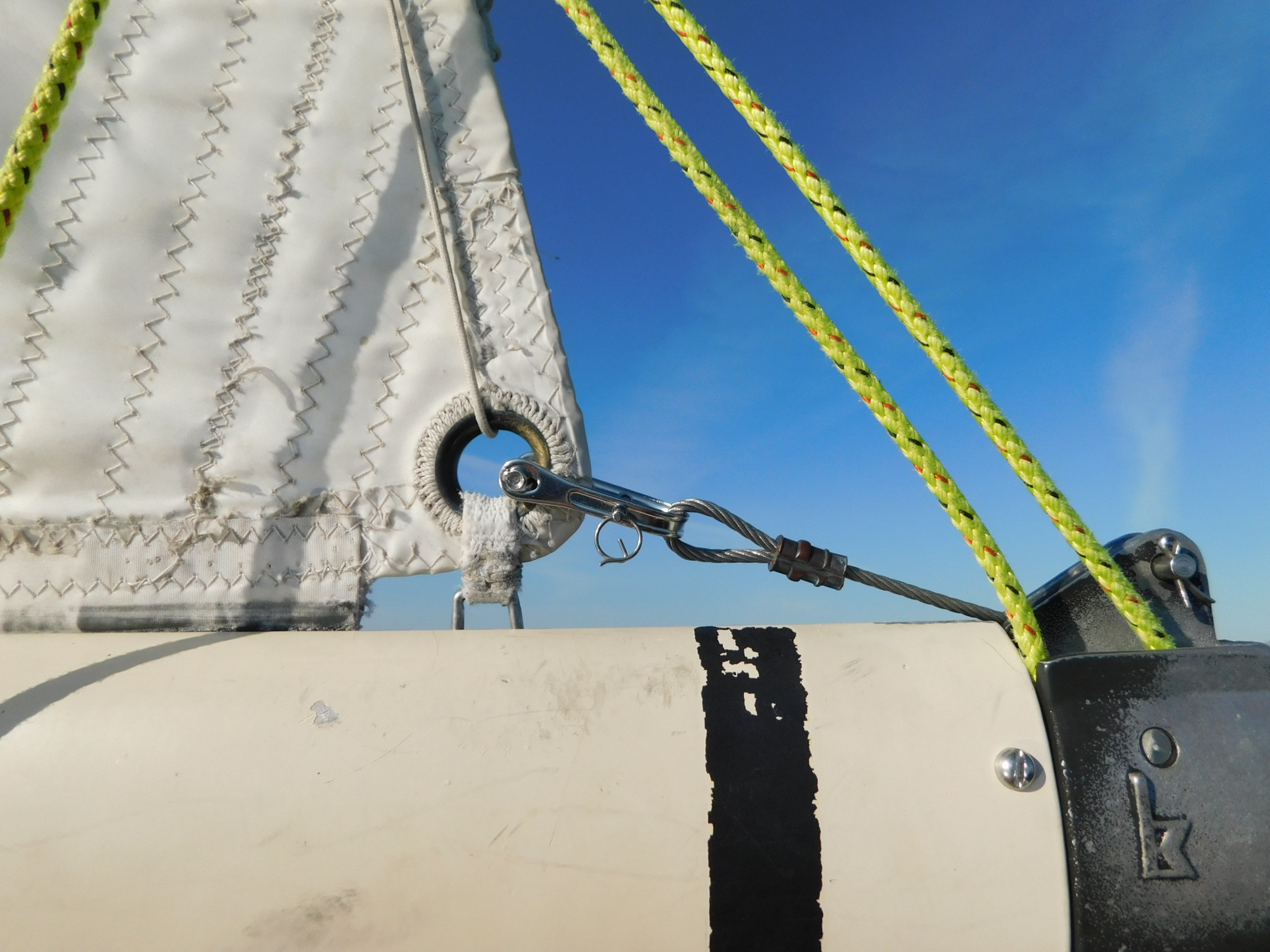
The outhaul on a US Yachts US 22 sailboat. This design uses a braided steel cable, with a swaged thimble and clevis to attach to the sail clew grommet.

An outhaul is a control line found on a sailboat. It is an element of the running rigging, used to attach the mainsail clew to the boom and tensions the foot of the sail. It commonly uses a block at the boom end and a cleat on the boom, closer to the mast, to secure the line.

The outhaul is loosened to provide a fuller camber or tightened to give the sail foot a flatter camber. Depending on the wind, this will increase or decrease boat speed.

Sailboat designer and sailing theorist, Frank Bethwaite, recommended that the outhaul, along with the other sail controls on a racing sailboat, should be knotted and the boom marked with the settings for different wind speeds.
