= Gooseneck (sailing) =

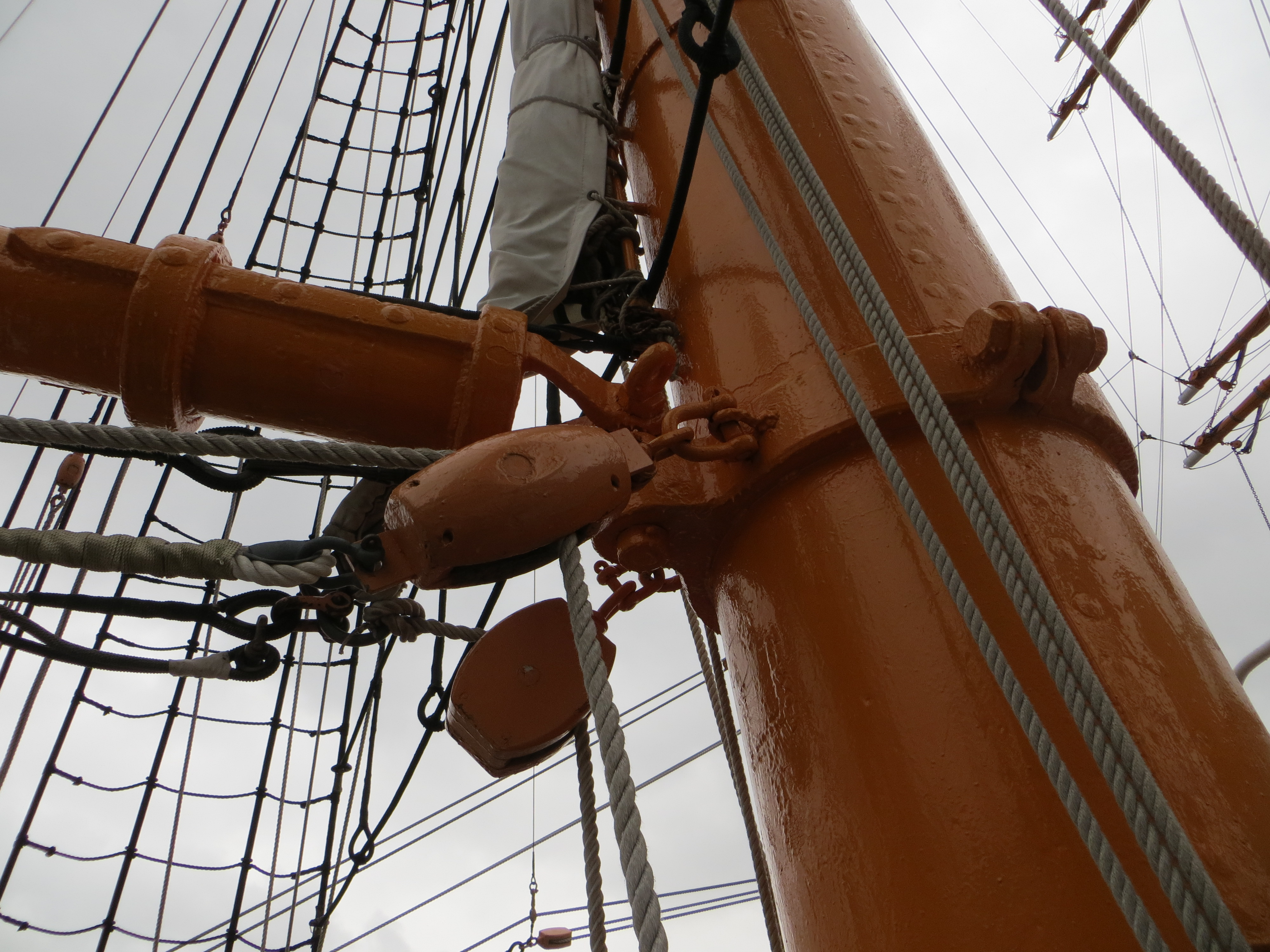
Gooseneck swivel on jigger-mast of Nippon Maru sail training vessel in Yokohama harbor

The gooseneck is the swivel connection on a sailboat by which the boom attaches to the mast. The boom may pivot in any direction, from side to side or up and down, by swiveling on the gooseneck.

The gooseneck may be a two-axis swivel as pictured. Having an integrated shackle for the tack is common. Goosenecks on older rigs may be formed by a loop attached to the end of the boom that fits loosely about the mast.

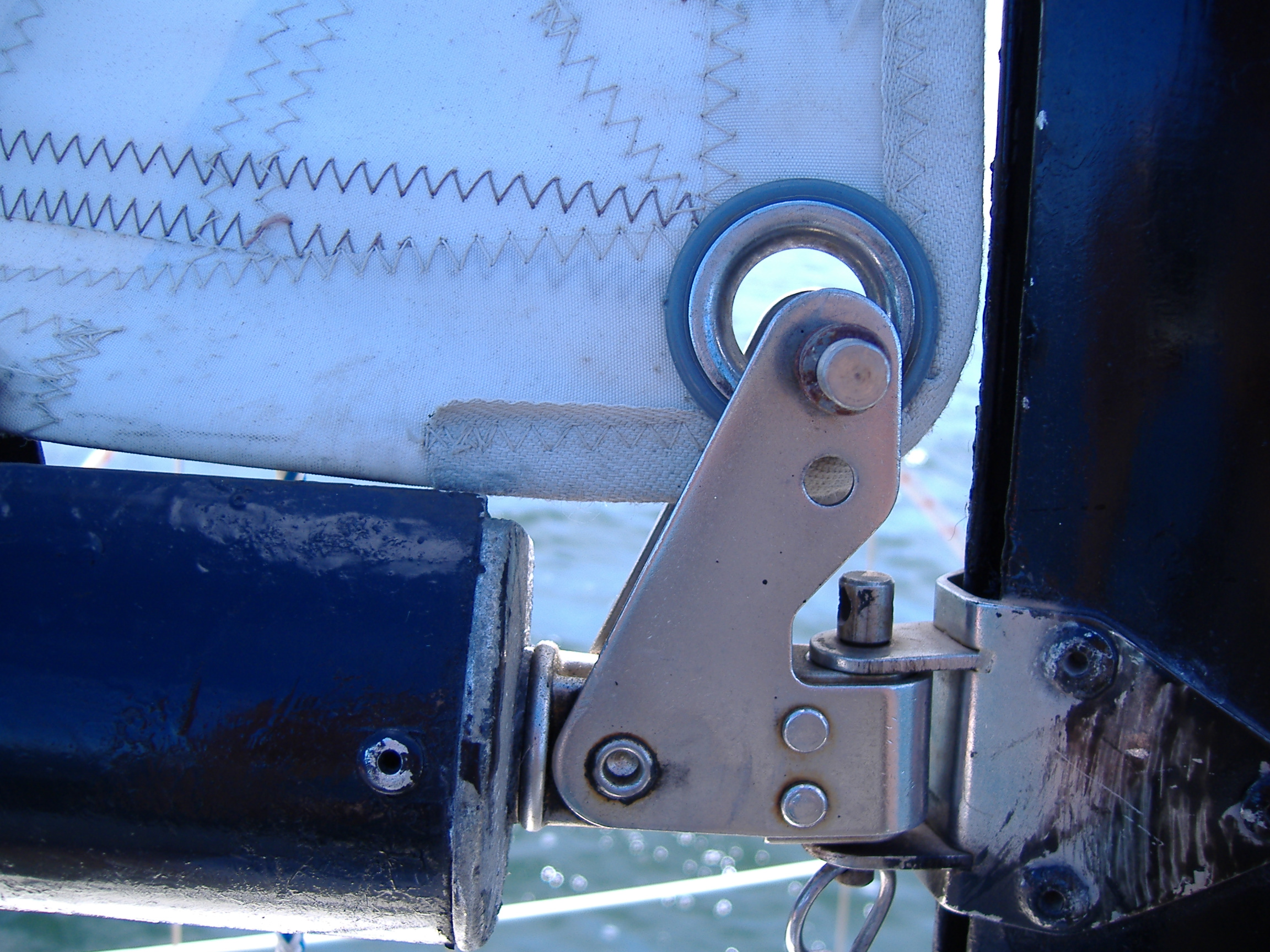
Gooseneck Swivel Connection On A Yacht
