= Grommet =

Ring or edge strip inserted into a hole through thin material

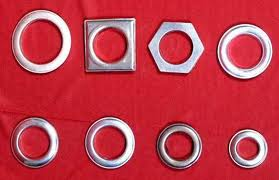
Curtain grommets, used among others in shower curtains

A grommet is a ring or edge strip inserted into a hole through thin material, typically a sheet of textile fabric, sheet metal or composite of carbon fiber, wood or honeycomb. Grommets are generally flared or collared on each side to keep them in place, and are often made of metal, plastic, or rubber. They may be used to prevent tearing or abrasion of the pierced material or protection from abrasion of the insulation on the wire, cable, line being routed through the penetration, and to cover sharp edges of the piercing, or all of the above.

A small grommet may also be called an eyelet, used for example on shoes, tarps and sails for lacing purposes.

Grommets in electrical applications are referred to as "insulating bushings". Most common are molded rubber bushings that are inserted into hole diameters up to 2″ (51 mm). There are many hole configurations from standard round to assorted U-shapes. Larger penetrations that are irregular in shape as well as long straight edges are often fitted with extruded or stamped strips of continuous length, referred to as "grommet edging". This type of protective bushing is quite common in applications that range from telecom switches and data center cabinets to complex and dense wire/cable and even hydraulic tubing in aircraft, transportation vehicles and medical equipment.

== As reinforcement or crafting ==
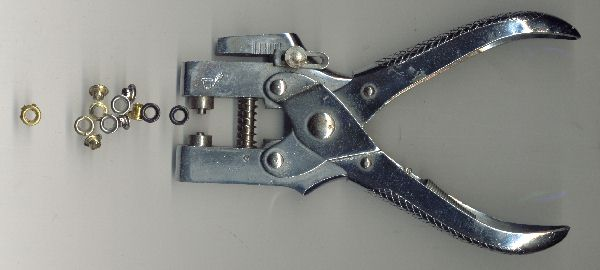
Metal eyelets and an eyelet setting tool

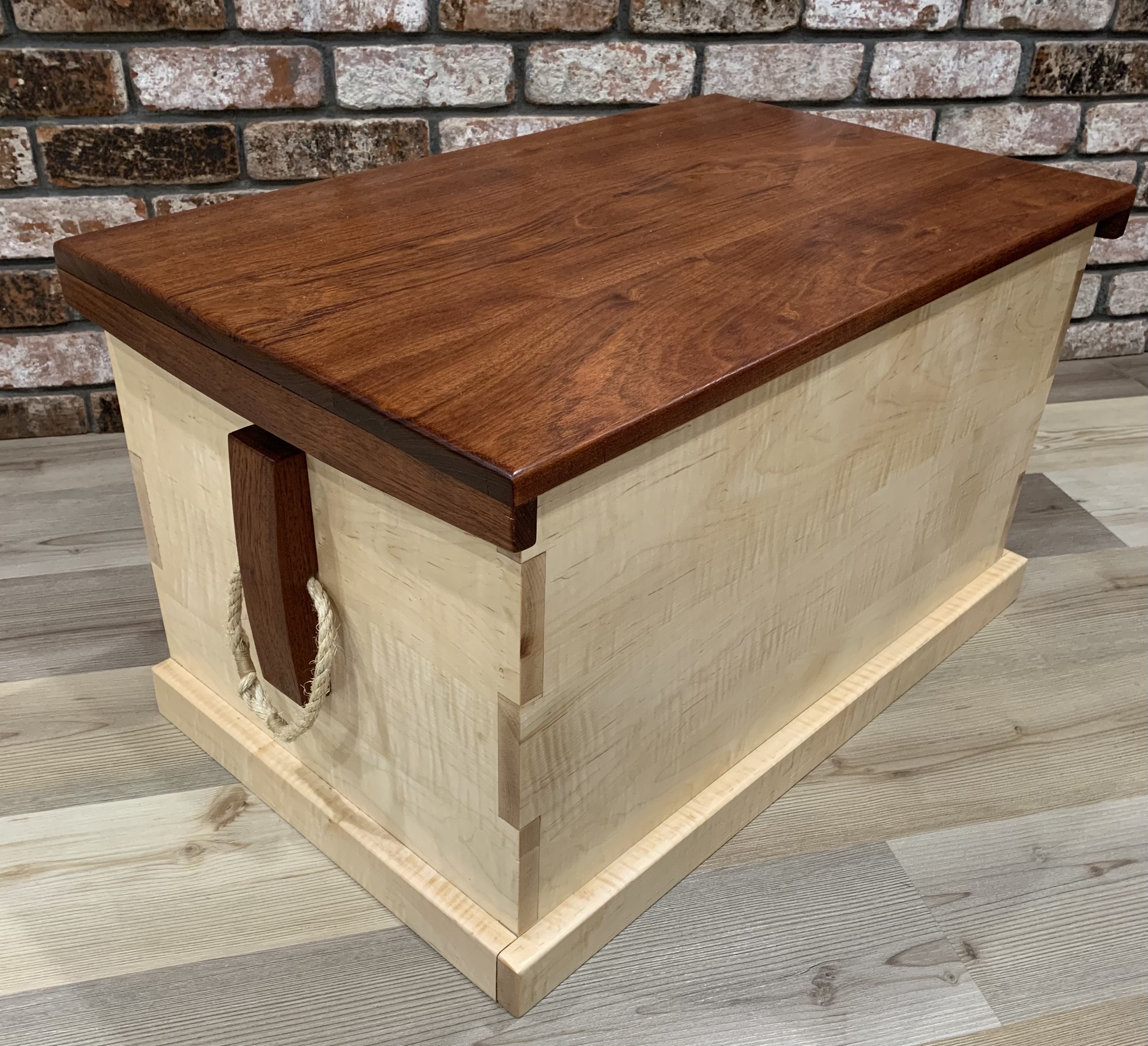
Seaman's chest with grommets fashioned for use as handles

Grommets are typically used to reinforce holes in leather, cloth, shoes, canvas and other fabrics. They can be made of metal, rubber, or plastic, and are easily used in common projects, requiring only the grommet itself and a means of setting it. A simple punch, a metal rod with a convex tip, is often sold with the grommets. It can be struck with a hammer to set the grommet. It can alternatively be set with an electronic, pneumatic, or gas-powered machine. There are also dedicated grommet presses with punch and anvil, as shown in the picture, ranging from inexpensive to better-quality tools, which are somewhat faster to use.

Typical applications are footwear for boot and shoe laces, in laced clothing such as corsets, in flags for hoisting, and in curtains and other household items that require hanging from hooks, as when they are used in conjunction with tensioner rods for shower curtains. The grommet prevents the cord from tearing through the hole, thereby providing structural integrity. Small grommets are also called eyelets, especially when used in clothing or crafting. Eyelets may be used purely decoratively for crafting. When used in sailing and various other applications, they are called cringles. Sometimes field workers refer to them as grunyons.

== Maritime use ==
Traditionally, rope grommets have been widely used on sailing ships in a variety of ways. They have been utilized as chest handles or on row boats with thole pins as a soft oar lock. They are a rope ring that is made by first disassembling the rope then re-weaving the strands to the desired size.

== Use in electrical equipment ==
=== For cable protection ===
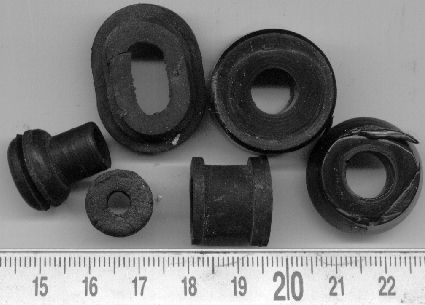
Cable grommets

Holes in metal or another hard material will often have sharp edges. Electrical wires, cord, rope, lacings, or other soft vulnerable material passing through the hole can become abraded or cut, or electrical insulation may break due to repeated flexing at the exit point of the casing of a junction box for example. Rubber, plastic or plastic coated metal grommets are used to avoid this. Tight fitting rubber grommets can also prevent the entry of dirt, air, water, etc. The smooth and sometimes soft inner surface of the grommet shields the wire from damage.

Grommets are generally used whenever wires pass through punched or drilled sheet metal or plastic casings for this reason. Molded and continuous strip grommets, also known as edge grommets, are manufactured in a wide variety of sizes and lengths expressly for this purpose; they are usually a single piece which can be inserted by hand. Two-piece hard plastic devices are available which also grip the wire that passes through. These are called strain relief bushings and are often used to insulate, anchor, and protect power cords where they enter panels. Preventing a tug or twist on the wire from stressing the electrical connections inside the connected equipment. Sleeved grommets have a flexible extension (sleeve), usually tapered or moulded to flex increasingly towards the free end in order to reduce fracturing of electrical insulation.

=== To minimize vibration ===
Grommets made of rubber or other elastic material are also used to minimize the transmission of vibration. They were widely used for mounting shock-sensitive computer disk drives, particularly in equipment subject to vibration or jarring, but are not usually used with more robust modern drives. The screws that hold the drive in place pass through grommets that decouple it acoustically from the chassis. Grommets are used in a similar way to acoustically isolate electronic circuit components that are susceptible to microphonism caused by mechanical vibration or jarring.

== Surgical grommets ==
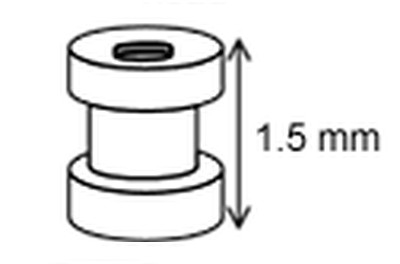
Tympanostomy tube

In chronic cases of otitis media with effusions present for months, surgery is sometimes performed to insert a grommet, called a "tympanostomy tube" into the eardrum to allow air to pass through into the middle ear, and thus release any pressure buildup and help clear excess fluid within.

This is also a correcting measure for a patulous Eustachian tube (when air moves to and from the middle ear with each breath making the eardrum flap).

== Gallery ==
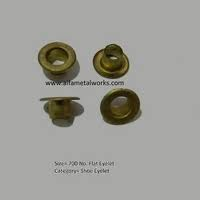
Brass eyelets

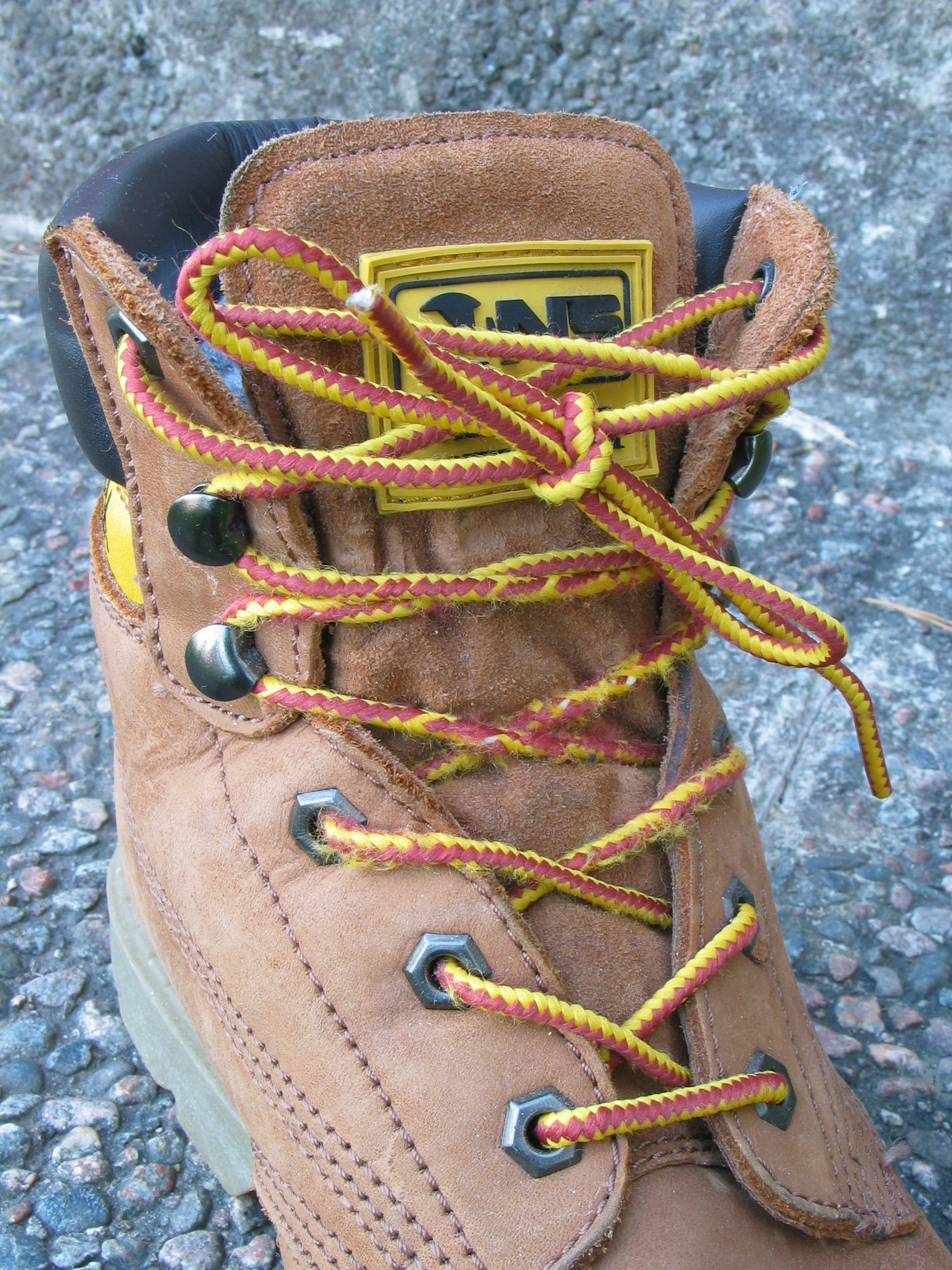
Mountain boot with 6 eyelets, 4 hooks, followed by 2 additional eyelets

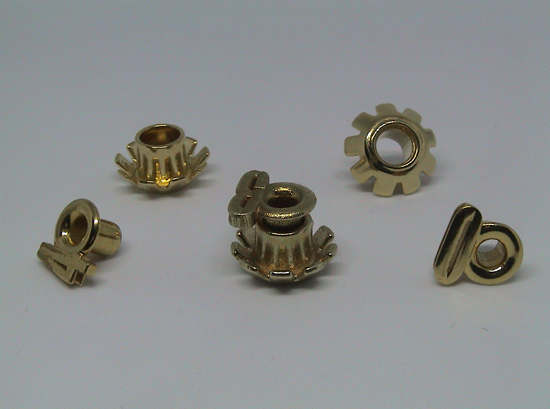
Alphabet eyelets

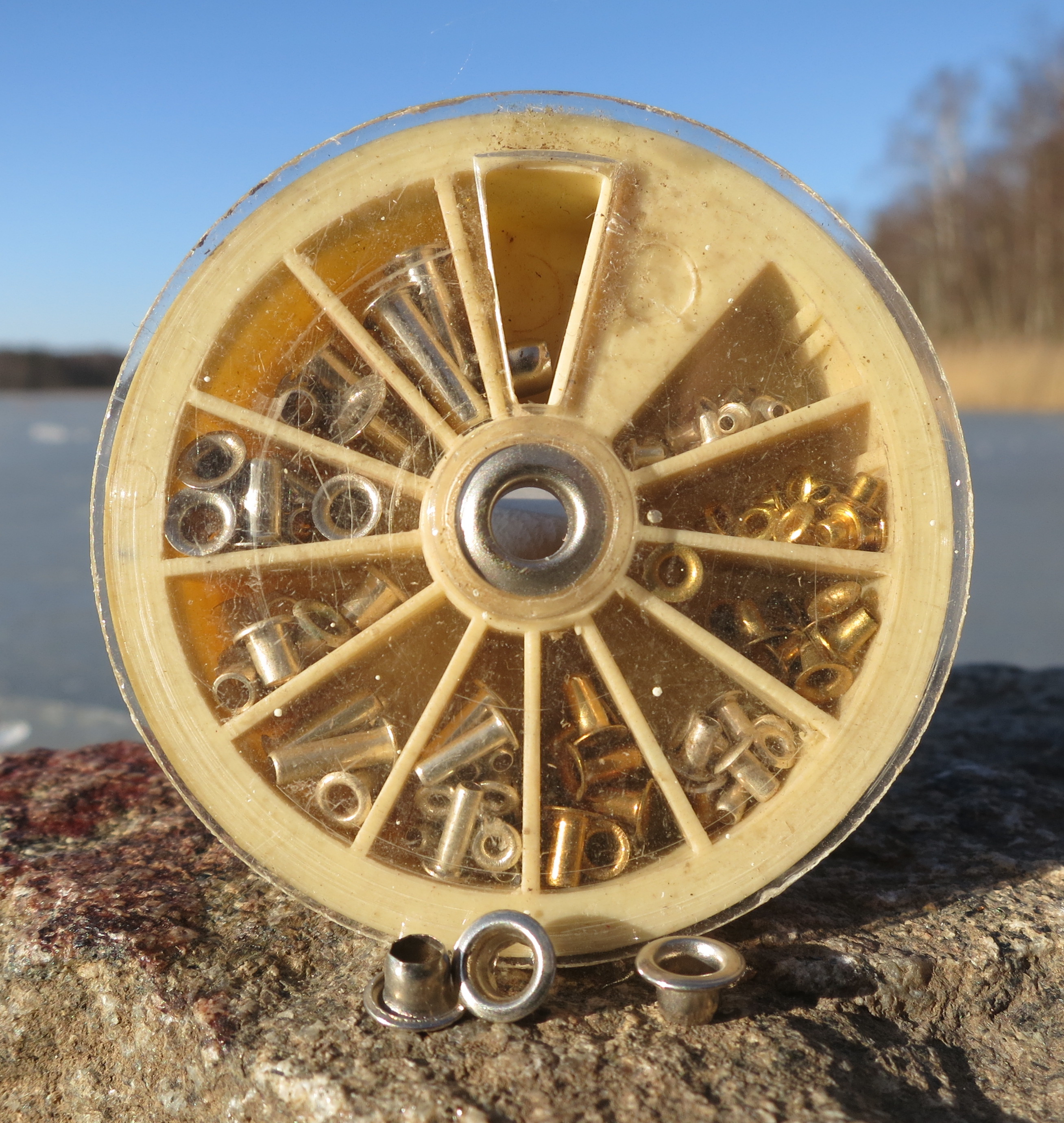
Assorted grommets in various sizes and materials, 1970s.

== See also ==
- Blind rivet
- Cable grommet
- Cringle
- Shoulder washer
