= Cringle =

Hole through which to pass a rope

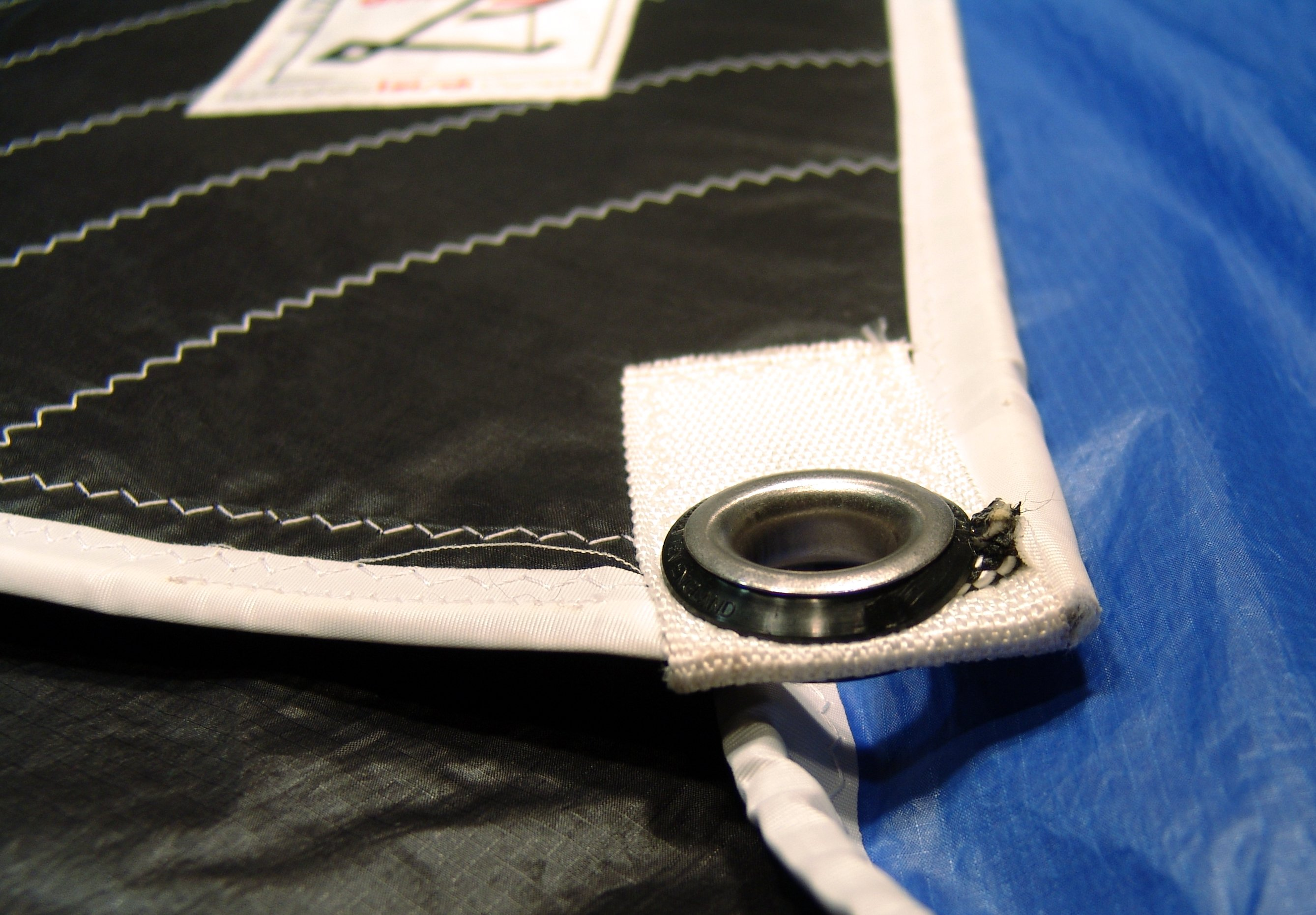
A cringle at the corner of a sail.

A cringle is an eye through which to pass a rope. In nautical settings, the word refers to a small hole anywhere along the edge or in the corner of a sail, rimmed with stranded cordage and worked into the boltrope. Typically it encloses a metal grommet for reinforcement and to reduce wear. In this context, cringle and grommet coincide enough that the two are sometimes used interchangeably.
