= Furl (sailing) =

Stowing a sail in a position from which it can be set

Furling refers to stowing a sail into a neat package after it has been handed, but leaving it still fastened in the position from which it can be set. For a sail with a boom, this usually means flaking the sail down over the boom and securing it with sail ties. The headsail of a sloop (where roller furling is not fitted) is often lashed to a guardrail or along a bowsprit.

A square sail is furled by gathering it more closely to the yard than is achieved by the buntlines and clewlines and securing it to the yard with gaskets. When bending a sail onto a yard, a square sail is usually furled at deck level, being tied to itself with temporary lashings, so as to provide a controllable package to haul aloft and fasten to the yard.

Less common sail types may be furled in different ways, but following the general principle of gathering in and folding before lashing the sail to the yard or mast on which it is set.

Many jibs and headsails are fitted with roller reefing or roller furling. The stay or the luff spar to which the sail is fixed is rotated (usually by a control line on a drum fitted just below the tack, with the line lead back to the cockpit). The rotation rolls the sail around the spar. This general system was introduced in 1887 and there are various modern improved versions. A strict terminology distinguishes between roller reefing and roller furling, with the latter not being robust enough to simply reef a sail.
