= Square rig =

Generic type of sail and rigging arrangement

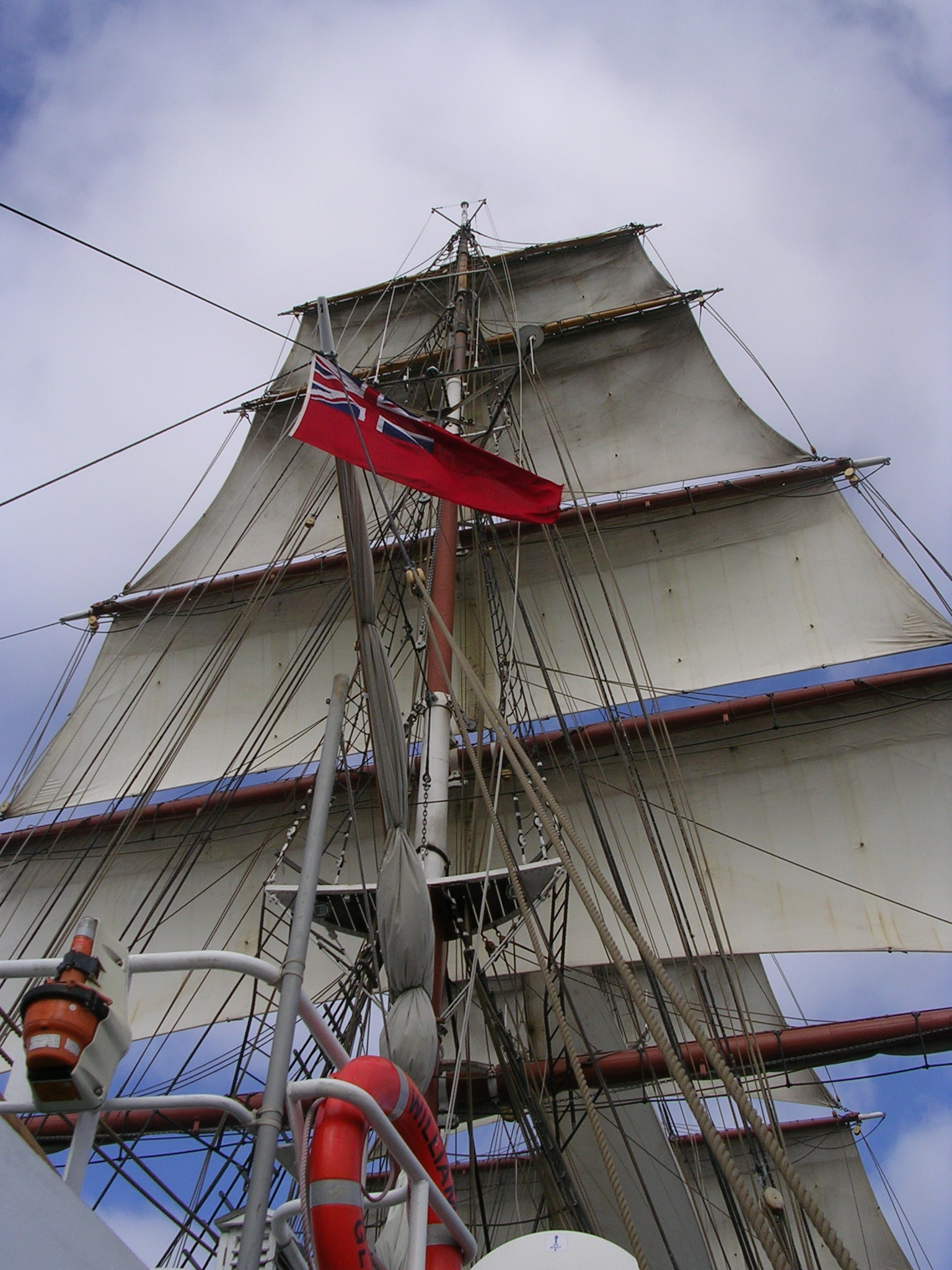
Main-mast of a square-rigged brig, with all square sails set except the course

Square rig is a generic type of sail and rigging arrangement in which a sailing vessel uses square sails which are carried on horizontal spars that, when at rest, are perpendicular (or square) to the centre line of the vessel. This is in contrast to fore and aft rig, where the sails are on the vessel's centre line when at rest. A consequence of this is that square sails have a front and a back surface, with the back always facing the wind when used to drive the ship forward, whilst fore and aft sails have a left and right surface, either of which may face the wind. The majority of square sails are symmetrical about an axis parallel to the mast, whilst most fore and aft sails are asymmetrical in shape.

A mast is considered to be fully square-rigged if it has square sails along its full height, including the lower mast. A ship is usually thought of as a square rigger if it has one or more fully square-rigged masts, though British Merchant Shipping Acts have historically had variations on that when deciding on the qualifications needed for some rigs.

Square rig has existed since, at the latest, Pharaonic Egypt, with different versions throughout history. Ships of much of the classical period had square sails with distinctive lead or bone rings which took brailing lines which were used to both furl and reef the sail. (Note: Brails of this type appeared c. 1200 BCE and continued in use until the Mediterranean Square Rig of the classical period was simplified (to save construction and maintenance costs) in the 5th century CE.) This meant that most of the sail handling was done from the deck. Larger classical period ships had more than one mast, sometimes with more than one sail per mast. Square rig essentially disappeared from the Mediterranean at the beginning of the Middle Ages, but was used extensively in Northern Europe. Viking warships and cargo vessels, and types such as the cog, all had a single mast with a single square sail. This was set by hoisting the yard from deck level. In the fifteenth century, the Mediterranean and Northern European traditions merged, resulting in vessels with more than one mast and more than one sail on some or all masts. This gave the full-rigged ship. By the seventeenth century, the improved staying of topmasts allowed the topsail to be used in stronger winds, with it being the first sail to be set and the last to be handed in rising winds. This meant that lower yards ceased to be hoisted on a regular basis and remained permanently in position. In the middle of the nineteenth century, iron masts and standing rigging were introduced, with steel replacing iron late in that century. The full-rigged ships at the beginning of the twentieth century were very different from their fifteenth-century predecessors.

== History ==
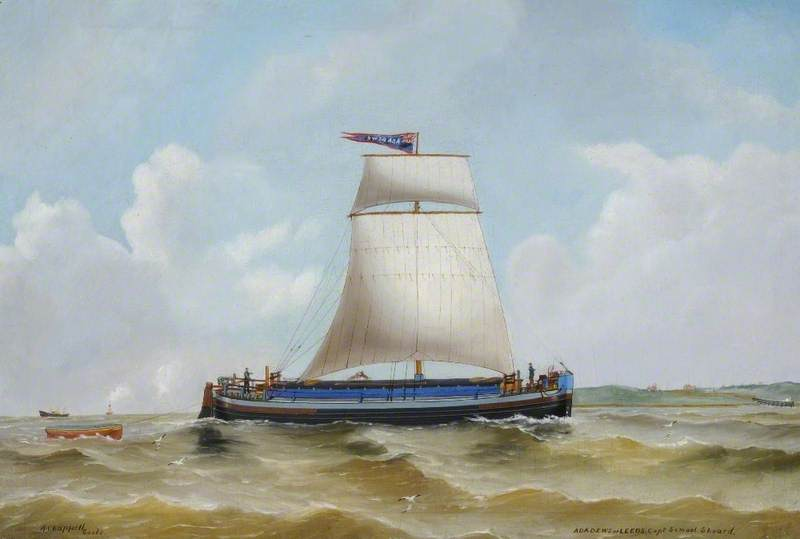
The single-masted, square-rigged Humber keel performed well to windward.

Single sail square rigs were used by the ancient Egyptians, the Phoenicians, the Greeks, the Romans, and the Celts. Later the Scandinavians, the Germanic peoples, and the Slavs adopted the single square-rigged sail, with it becoming one of the defining characteristics of the classic "Viking" ships.

== See also ==
- Glossary of nautical terms (A-L)
- Glossary of nautical terms (M-Z)
- Fore-and-aft rig
