= Rig (sailing) =

Arrangement of a ship's masts, sails, and ropes

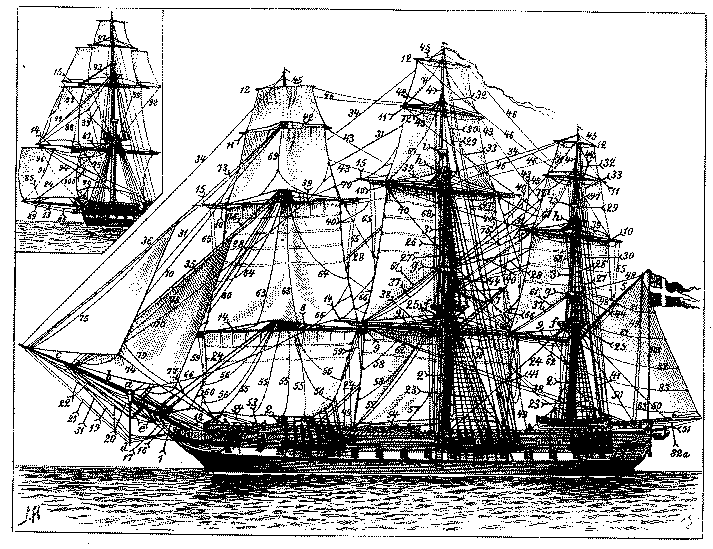
Rigging of a sailing frigate

A sailing vessel's rig is its arrangement of masts, sails and rigging. Examples include a schooner rig, cutter rig, junk rig, etc. A rig may be broadly categorized as "fore-and-aft", "square", or a combination of both. Within the fore-and-aft category there is a variety of triangular and quadrilateral sail shapes. Spars or battens may be used to help shape a given kind of sail. Each rig may be described with a sail plan—formally, a drawing of a vessel, viewed from the side.

Modern examples of single-person sailing craft, such as windsurfers, iceboats, and land-sailing craft, typically have uncomplicated rigs with a single sail on a mast with a boom.

== Introduction ==
In the English language, ships were usually described, until the end of the eighteenth century, in terms of their type of hull design. Using the type of rig as the main type identifier for a vessel became common only in the nineteenth century. This is illustrated by the terminology for ships in the large fleet of colliers that traded to London from the coal ports of the Northeast of England (of which HMS Endeavour was a well-known example). Many of these full-rigged ships (square rigged on all of three masts) had the hull type "bark" – another common classification was "cat". In the second half of the eighteenth century, the square sails on the mizzen were often eliminated. The resulting rig acquired the name of the hull type: initially as "bark" and soon as "barque". This explains the Royal Navy's description of Endeavour as a "cat-built bark".

== Design ==
Sail plan of a sloop

Each rig may be described with a sail plan—a drawing of a vessel, viewed from the side, depicting its sails, the spars that carry them and some of the rigging that supports the rig. By extension, "sail plan" describes the arrangement of sails on a vessel. A well-designed sail plan should be balanced, requiring only light forces on the helm to keep the sailing craft on course. The fore-and-aft center of effort on a sail plan is usually slightly behind the center of resistance of the hull, (Note: Note: not all sailing craft are boats; land yachts have wheels and ice yachts have runners. For the sake of clarity, this article will generally address only waterborne craft.) so that the sailing craft will tend to turn into the wind if the helm is unattended. The height of the sail plan's center of effort above the surface is limited by the sailing craft's ability to avoid capsize, which is a function of its hull shape, ballast, or hull spacing (in the case of catamarans and trimarans).

=== Types of rig ===
- Fore-and-aft rig features sails that run fore and aft (along the length of the sailing craft), controlled by lines called "sheets", that changes sides, as the bow passes through the wind from one side of the craft to the other. Fore-and-aft rig variants include:
  - Bermuda rig (also known as a Marconi rig) features a three-sided mainsail.
  - Gaff rig features a four-sided mainsail with the upper edge made fast to a spar called a gaff.
  - Spritsail rig features a four-sided mainsail with the aft upper corner supported by a diagonal spar, called a sprit, whose lower end meets the mast near the foot of the sail.
  - Lateen rig features a three-sided sail set on a long yard, mounted at an angle on the mast and running in a fore-and-aft direction.
  - Crab claw sail (also known as Oceanic sprit or Oceanic lateen) features a three-sided sail with spars on both the foot and the head. It's either mastless, supported by a "prop", or mounted on removable or fixed masts.
  - Tanja sail (also known as canted square/rectangular sail, balance lugsail, or boomed lugsail) features a four-sided sail with spars on both the foot and the head. It's mounted on removable or fixed masts.
- A square rigged vessel has at least one square rigged mast, a term that denotes a mast where square sails can be set at all levels of the mast. Other masts on the same vessel may be fore-and-aft rigged, giving, for example, a barque. It is common for fully square rigged vessels to include some fore and aft sails, such as staysails and jibs. A vessel which is not square rigged, such as a topsail schooner, may still use square sails, but not in locations that define the ship as a square rigger.
  Square sails are generally suspended from yards which, when at rest, are at right angles ("square") to the centre-line of the vessel. This differentiates them from fore-and-aft sails, which are aligned along the centre-line when at rest. Operationally, this means that square sails always present the same surface of the sail to the wind when propelling a vessel forward: they have a front and a back. Fore-and-aft sails can have either of their surfaces facing the wind when in use. Hence either vertical edge of a square sail may be the front (when sailing to windward) but fore-and-aft sails always have the same vertical edge at the front.

=== Types of sail ===
Each form of rig requires its own type of sails. Among them are:

- A staysail (pronounced stays'l) is a fore-and-aft sail whose leading edge (or luff) is hanked to a stay.
- A headsail is any sail forward of the foremost mast on a sailing boat. It is usually a fore-and-aft sail, but on older sailing ships would include a square-sail on a bowsprit.
- A jib is a headsail that is set in front of any other headsails, or in modern usage, may be the only headsail. It may be hanked to a stay, used in roller reefing or set flying (as in the more traditional cutter rigs). In a large vessel with many headsails, you may, for example, find a flying jib, outer-jib, inner-jib and then the fore-staysail.
- A genoa is a large jib that increases area by extending rearward of the mast.
- A spinnaker is a full sail of light material for use when sailing downwind in light airs. When in use, the jib or genoa would be lowered.
- A gennaker is a sail that is a cross between a genoa and a spinnaker.
- A mainsail ("mains'l") is a sail attached to the main mast. The principal types include:
  1. A square-rig mainsail is a square sail attached at the bottom of the main mast.
  2. A Bermuda-rig mainsail is a triangular sail with the luff attached to the mast with the foot or lower edge generally attached to a boom.
  3. A gaff-rig mainsail is a quadrilateral sail whose head is supported by a gaff.
  4. A spritsail-rig mainsail is a quadrilateral sail whose aft head is supported by a sprit.
- A lug sail is an asymmetric quadrilateral sail suspended on a spar and hoisted up the mast as a fore-and-aft sail.
- A mizzen sail is a small triangular or quadrilateral sail at the stern of a boat.
- A steadying sail is a mizzen sail on motor vessels such as old-fashioned drifters and navy ships (such as HMS Prince Albert). The sail's prime function is to reduce rolling rather than to provide drive.
Quadrilateral examples

A square sail is loose-footed, but may be attached to a spar, below.

A junk sail has multiple transverse battens.

A lugsail has a tall asymmetrical shape.

A settee sail has an elongated asymmetrical shape.

A gaff rigged sail has a spar above and a boom below.

A gunter rig has a vertical spar that extends vertically above the mast.
Triangular examples

A bermuda rigged sail has one edge attached to the mast.

A lateen sail is loose-footed.

A crabclaw sail has spars along two sides.

Spinnakers are attached at their corners.

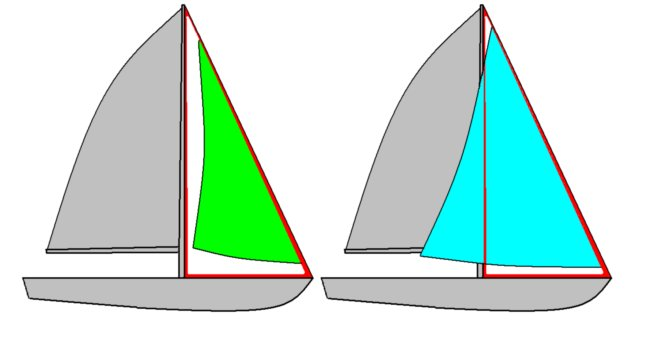
Staysails include jibs.

== European and American vessels ==
Ships that sailed from Europe and the Americas could be categorized in a variety of ways, by number of masts and by sailing rig.

Single-masted sailing vessels include the catboat, cutter and sloop. Two-masted vessels include the bilander, brig, brigantine, ketch, schooner, snow, and yawl. Three-masted vessels include the barque, barquentine, polacre and full-rigged ship. Luggers could have one or two masts and schooners could have two or more masts.

=== Square-rigged masts ===
Hierarchy of possible sails on a square rigged mast

A three-masted vessel has, from front to back, a foremast, mainmast and mizzenmast. A two-masted vessel has a mainmast, the other being a foremast or mizzen. Ships with more than three masts may simply number them or use another scheme, as with the five-masted Preussen.

On a square-sailed vessel, the sails of each mast are named by the mast and position on the mast. For instance, on the mainmast (from bottom to top):

- main course
- main topsail
- main topgallant ("t'gallant")
- main royal
- main skysail
- main moonraker. (Note: Since the early nineteenth century, the topsails and topgallants are often split into a lower and an upper sail to allow them to be more easily handled. This makes the mast appear to have more "sails" than it officially has.)

On many ships, sails above the top (a platform just above the lowest sail on the fore, main and mizzens masts) were mounted on separate mast segments—"topmasts" or "topgallant masts"—held in wooden sockets called "trestletrees". These masts and their stays could be rigged or struck as the weather conditions required, or for maintenance and repair.

In light breezes, the working square sails would be supplemented by studding sails ("stuns'l") out on the ends of the yardarms. These were called as a regular sail, with the addition of "studding". For example, the main top studding sail.

Between the main mast and mizzen as well as between main mast and foremast, the staysails between the masts are named from the sail immediately below the highest attachment point of the stay holding up that staysail. Thus, the mizzen topgallant staysail can be found dangling from the stay leading from above the mizzen (third) mast's topgallant sail (i.e., from the mizzen topgallant yard) to at least one and usually two sails down from that on the main mast (the slope of the top edge of all staysail lines runs from a higher point nearer the stern to a lower point towards the bow).

The jibs (the staysails between the foremast and the bowsprit) are named (from inner to outer most) fore topmast staysail (or foretop stay), inner jib, outer jib and flying jib. Many of the jibs' stays meet the foremast just above the fore topgallant. A fore royal staysail may also be set.

== Austronesian and East Asian vessels ==
Austronesian rigs include what are generally called crab claw (also misleadingly called the "oceanic lateen" or the "oceanic sprit") and tanja rigs. They were used for double-canoe (catamaran), single-outrigger (on the windward side), or double-outrigger boat configurations, in addition to monohulls. These rigs were independently developed by the Austronesian peoples during the Neolithic, beginning with the crab claw sail at around 1500 BCE. They are used throughout the range of the Austronesian Expansion, from Maritime Southeast Asia, to Micronesia, Island Melanesia, Polynesia, and Madagascar.

=== Crab claw ===
There are several distinct types of crab claw rigs, but unlike western rigs, they do not have fixed conventional names. Crab claw sails are rigged fore-and-aft and can be tilted and rotated relative to the wind. They evolved from V-shaped perpendicular square sails in which the two spars converge at the base of the hull. The simplest form of the crab claw sail (also with the widest distribution) is composed of a triangular sail supported by two light spars (sometimes erroneously called "sprits") on each side. They were originally mastless, and the entire assembly was taken down when the sails were lowered.

The need to propel larger and more heavily laden boats led to the increase in vertical sail. However this introduced more instability to the vessels. In addition to the unique invention of outriggers to solve this, the sails were also leaned backwards and the converging point moved further forward on the hull. This new configuration required a loose "prop" in the middle of the hull to hold the spars up, as well as rope supports on the windward side. This allowed more sail area (and thus more power) while keeping the center of effort low and thus making the boats more stable. The prop was later converted into fixed or removable canted masts where the spars of the sails were actually suspended by a halyard from the masthead. This type of sail is most refined in Micronesian proas which could reach very high speeds. These configurations are sometimes known as the "crane sprit" or the "crane spritsail".

Another evolution of the basic crab claw sail is the conversion of the upper spar into a fixed mast. In Polynesia, this gave the sail more height while also making it narrower, giving it a shape reminiscent of crab pincers (hence "crab claw" sail). This was also usually accompanied by the lower spar becoming more curved.

Micronesian, Island Melanesian, and Polynesian single-outrigger vessels also used the canted mast configuration to uniquely develop shunting. In shunting vessels, both ends are alike, and the boat is sailed in either direction, but it has a fixed leeward side and a windward side. The boat is shunted from beam reach to beam reach to change direction, with the wind over the side, a low-force procedure. The bottom corner of the crab claw sail is moved to the other end, which becomes the bow as the boat sets off back the way it came. The mast usually hinges, adjusting the rake or angle of the mast. The crab claw configuration used on these vessels is a low-stress rig, which can be built with simple tools and low-tech materials, but it is extremely fast. On a beam reach, it may be the fastest simple rig.

Crab claw examples

Melanesian V-shaped square sail

New Zealand V-shaped square sail

Polynesian crab claw sail

New Guinea crab claw sail

Hawaiian crab claw sail with the upper spar merged with the fixed mast

=== Tanja ===
The conversion of the prop to a fixed mast in the crab claw sail led to the much later invention of the tanja sail (also known variously and misleadingly as the canted square sail, canted rectangular sail, boomed lugsail, or balance lugsail). Tanja sails were rigged similarly to crab claw sails and also had spars on both the head and the foot of the sails; but they were square or rectangular with the spars not converging into a point. They are generally mounted on one or two (rarely three or more) bipod or tripod masts, usually made from thick bamboo. The masts have curved heads with grooves for attaching the halyards. The lower part of two of the bamboo poles of the mast assembly have holes that are fitted unto the ends of a cross-wise length of timber on the deck, functioning like a hinge. The forward part of the mast assembly had a forelock. By unlocking it, the mast can be lowered across the ship.

Despite the similarity of its appearance to western square rigs, the tanja is a fore-and-aft rig similar to a lugsail. The sail was suspended from the upper spar ("yard"), while the lower spar functioned like a boom. When set fore-and-aft, the spars extend forward of the mast by about a third of their lengths. When running before the wind, they are set perpendicular to the hull, similar to a square rig. The sail can be rotated around the mast (lessening the need for steering with the rudders) and tilted to move the center of pull forward or aft. The sail can even be tilted completely horizontally, becoming wing-like, to lift the bow above incoming waves. The sail is reefed by rolling it around the lower spar.

In addition to the tanja sails, ships with the tanja rigs also have bowsprits set with a quadrilateral headsail, sometimes also canted as depicted in the Borobudur ships. In the colonial era, these were replaced by triangular western-style jibs (often several in later periods), and the tanja sails themselves were slowly replaced with western rigs like gaff rigs.

Tanja examples

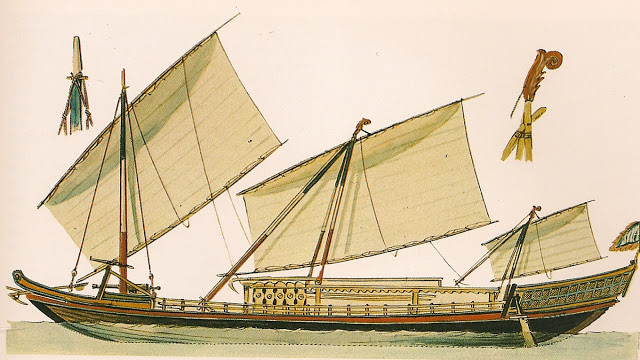
Iranun lanong with three tanja sails on a combination of single and tripod masts

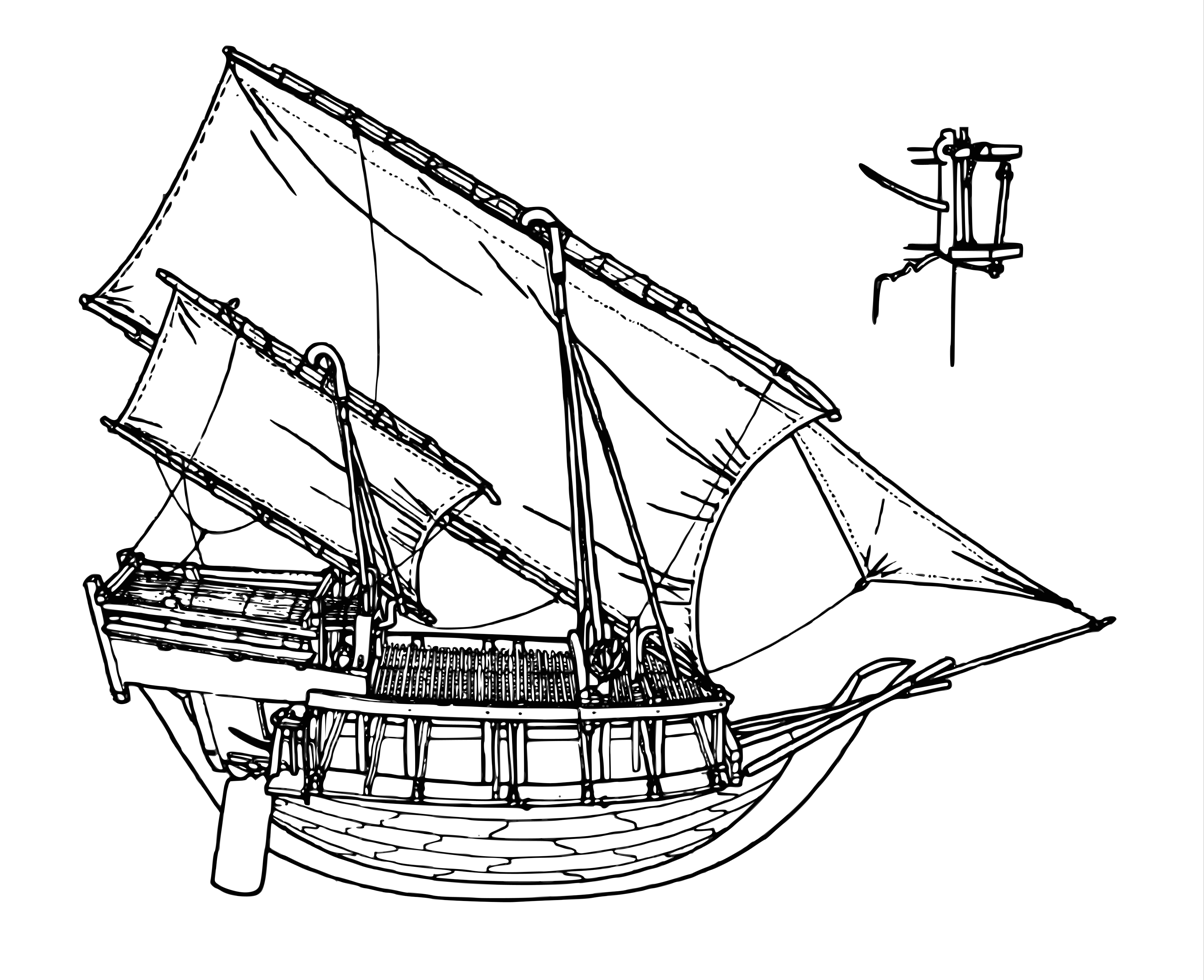
Makassar benawa with tanja sails on removable tripod masts and a jib

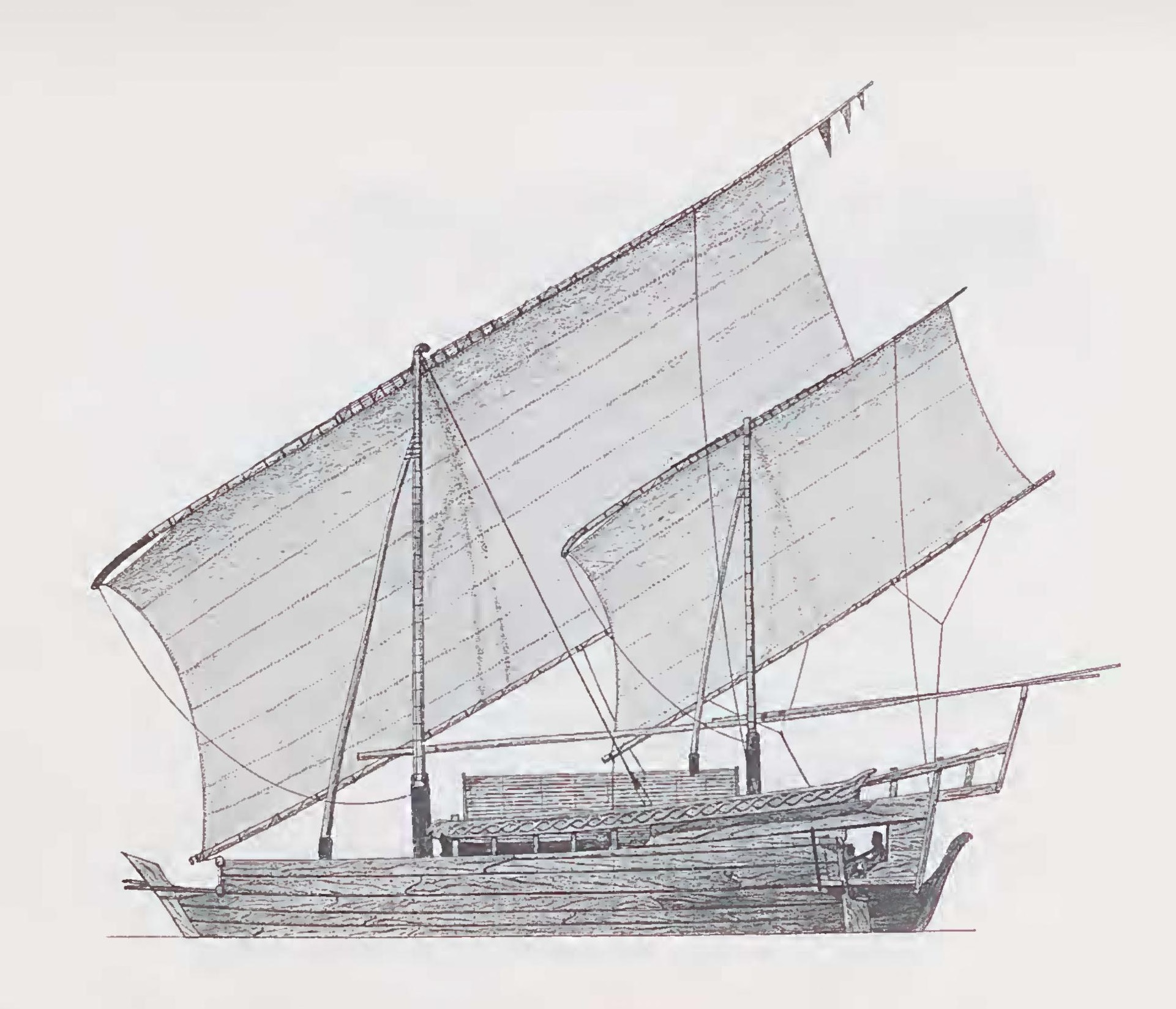
Makassar padewakang with tanja sails on bipod masts

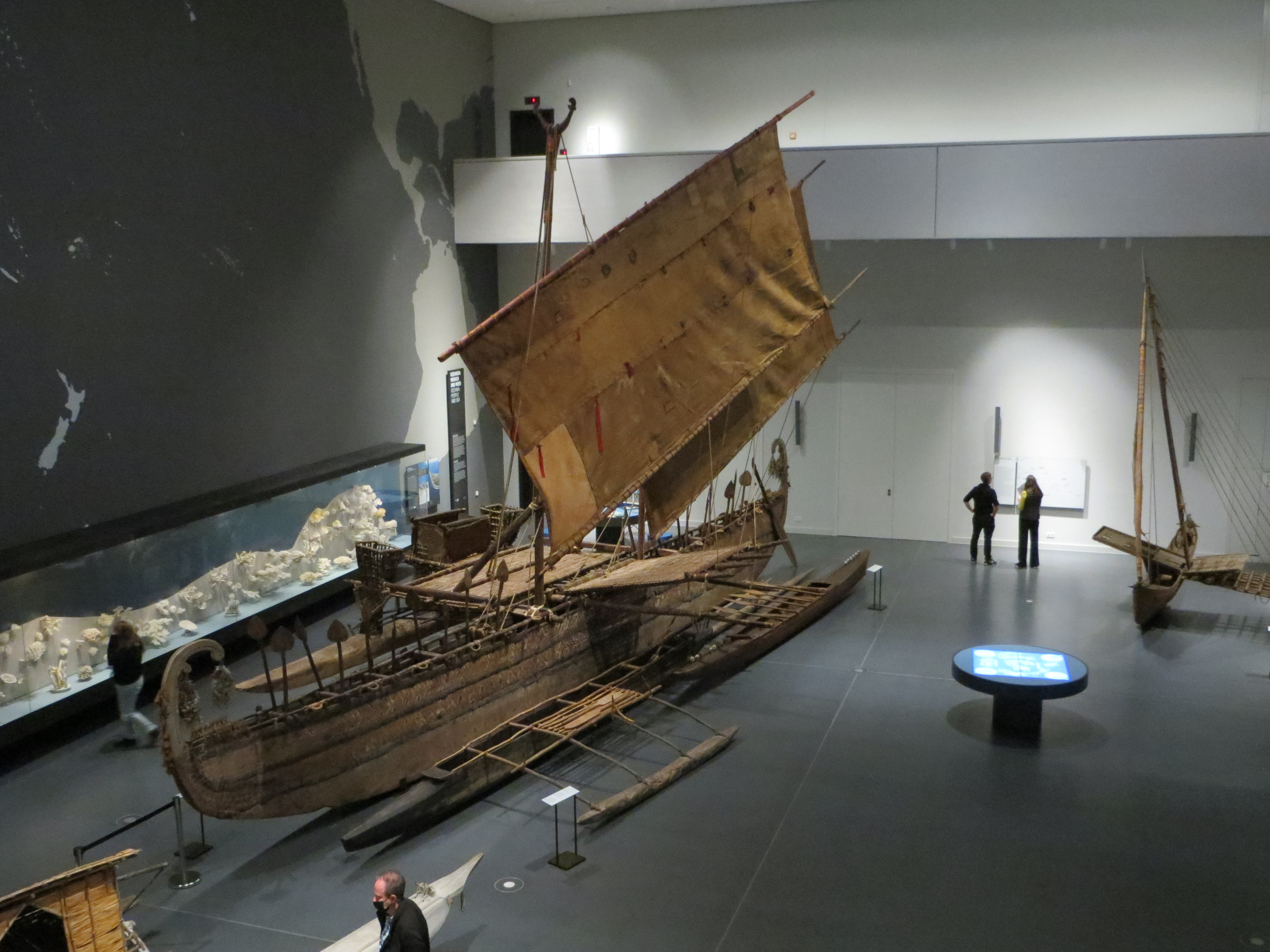
Micronesian catamaran with tanja sails on single fixed masts

=== Junk ===
The oldest undisputed depiction of the junk rig is from the Bayon temple (c. 12th to 13th century) of Angkor Thom, Cambodia, which shows a ship with a keel and a sternpost and identifies it as Southeast Asian. Historians Paul Johnstone and Joseph Needham suggest an Austronesian (specifically Indonesian) origin of the rig. Junk rigs were adopted by the Chinese by around the 12th century. Iconographic remains show that Chinese ships before the 12th century used square sails. It also further diffused into other East Asian shipbuilding traditions, notably Japan.

In its most traditional form the junk rig is carried on an unstayed mast (i.e. a mast without shrouds or stays, supported only on the step at the keelson and the partners); however, standing rigging of some kind is not uncommon. It is typical to run the halyards (lines used to raise and lower the sail) and sheets (lines used to trim the sail) to the companionway on a junk-rigged boat. This means that typical sailhandling can be performed from the relative safety of the cockpit, or even while the crew is below deck.

Junk sails are typically carried on a mast which rakes (slants) forward a few degrees from vertical. This causes the sail to swing outwards, absent wind pushing it, which makes the use of a preventer (a line to keep the sail extended) unnecessary.

Junk examples

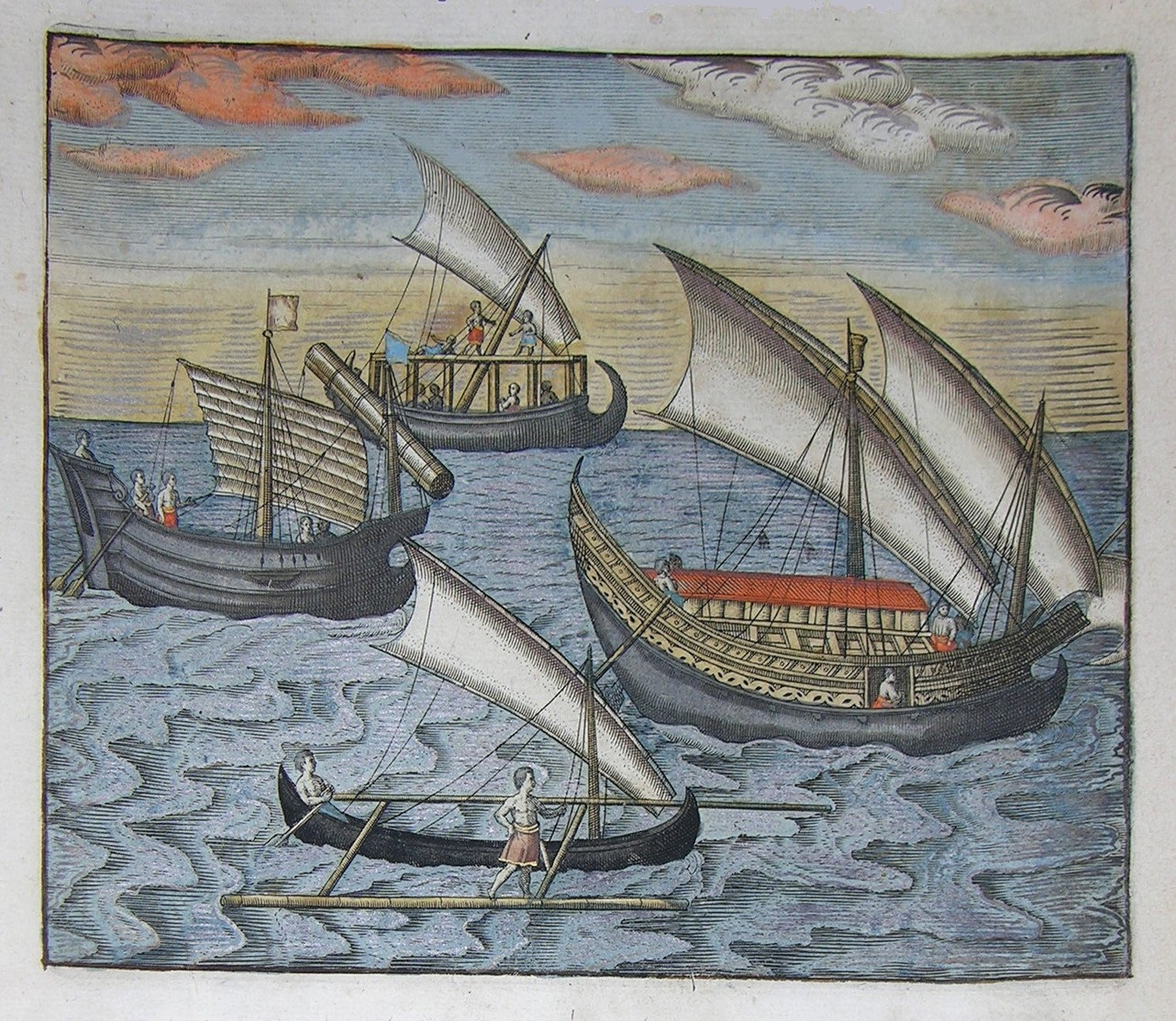
Southeast Asian djongs (D'Eerste Boeck, c. 1599) with both tanja and junk rigs

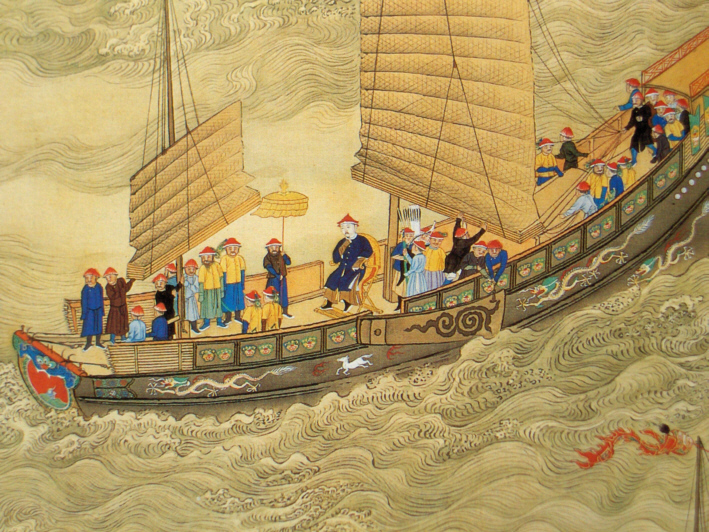
Qing dynasty Chinese junk (chuán) (c. 18th century), note the partially reefed sails

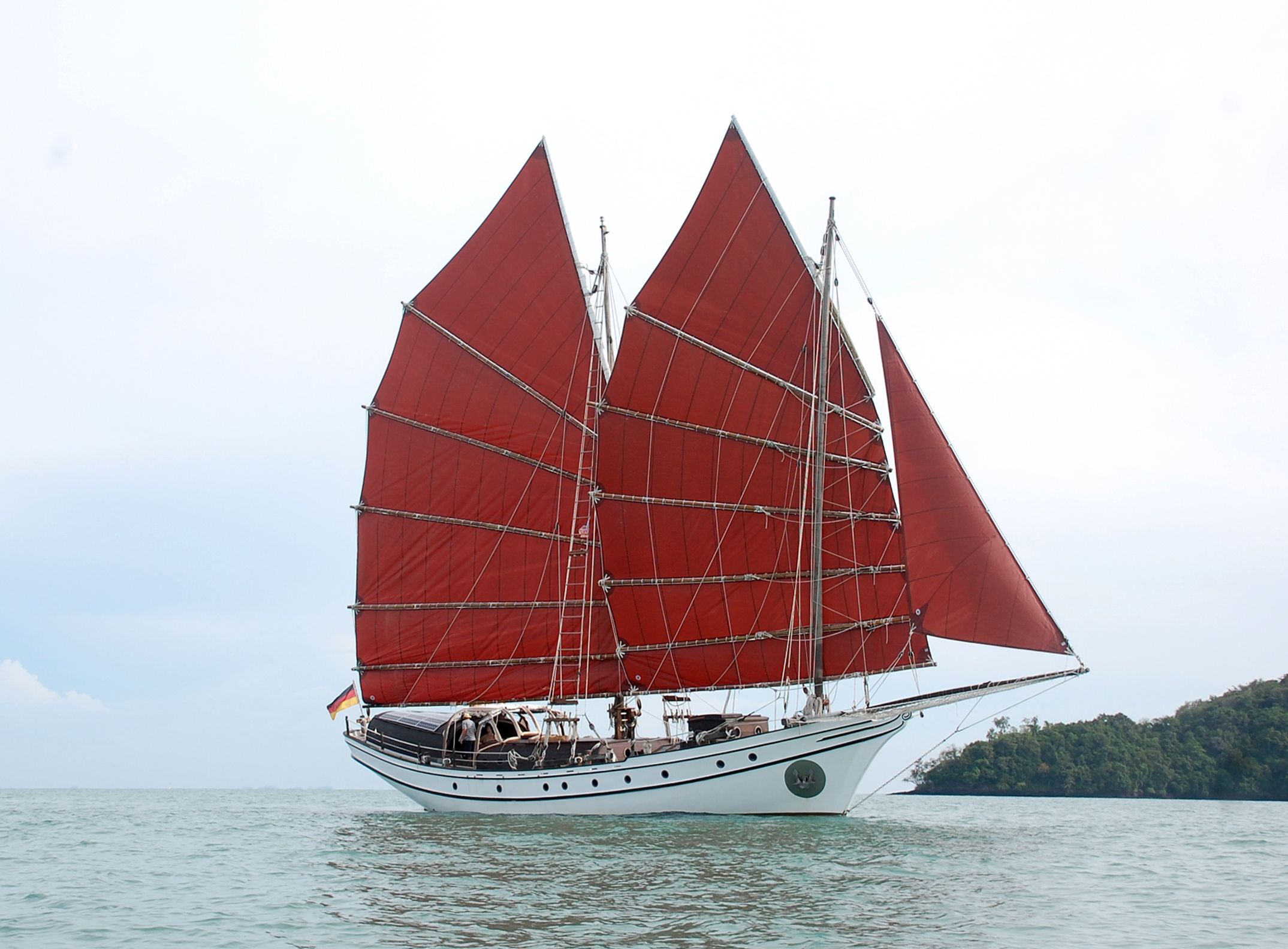
Malay pinas

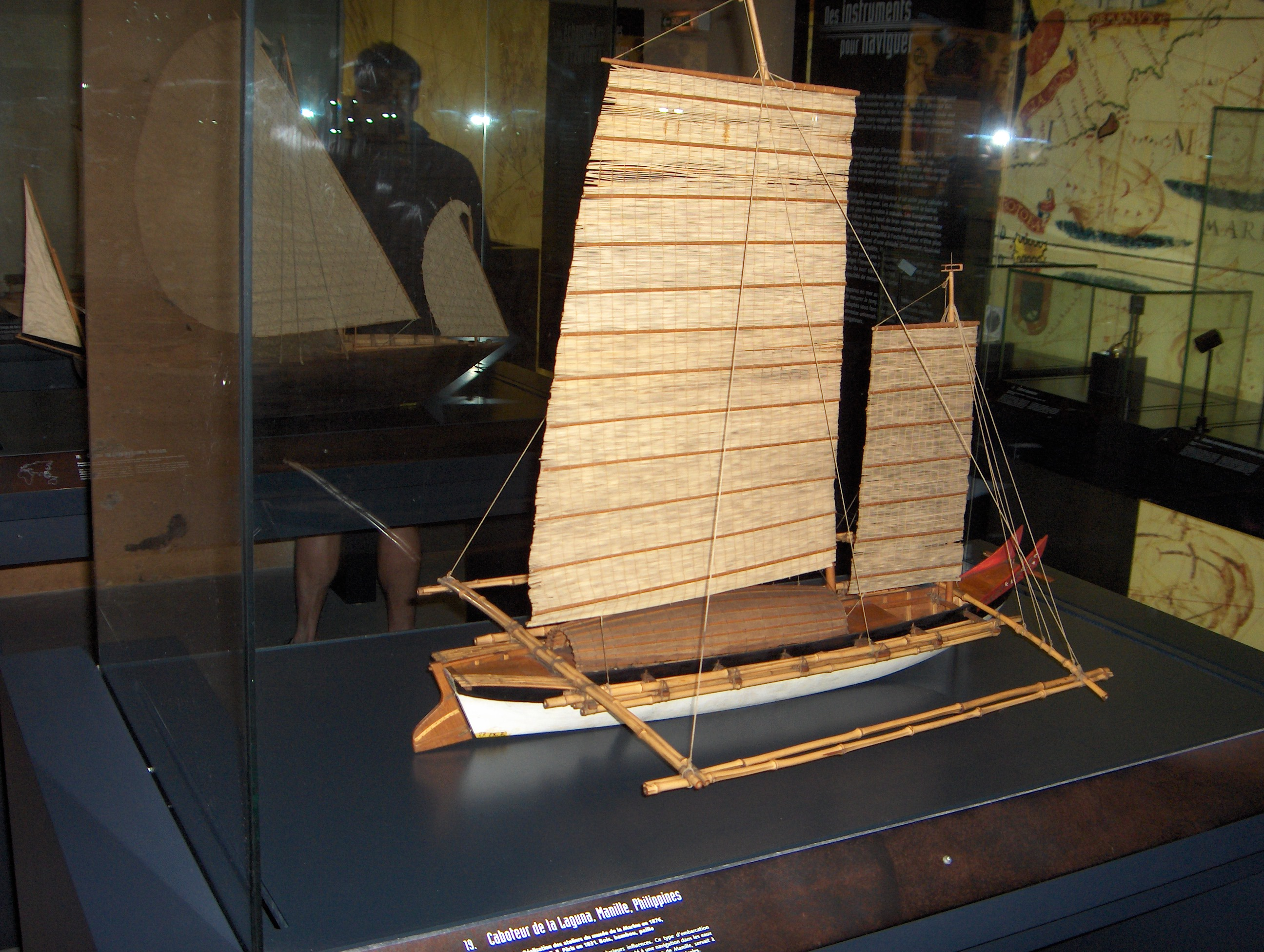
Tagalog balación

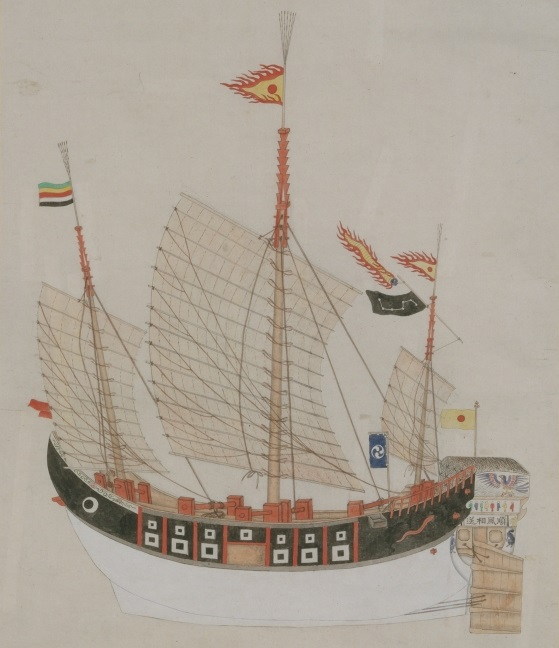
Japanese kai-sen

== South Asian and Middle Eastern vessels ==
=== Dhow ===
Unlike European ships, South Asian and Middle Eastern vessels are not named based on the type of rigging, but are named based on hull shapes. All of them are rigged similarly, and thus most of these vessels are classified as dhows in European terminology. Dhows are believed to have originated from India. They have loose-footed quadrilateral settee sails (sometimes also fully triangular lateen sails). The sails could not be reefed, instead two main sails were usually carried by the ship, one for night and bad weather, and another for daytime and fair weather. The yard was usually very long in comparison to the actual length of the boat, and they are sometimes made of two pieces of timber joined by a strengthening piece. The halyard was threaded into two holes on the yard to prevent it slipping along the length. The mast was slotted into a mast step fitted over the deck.<

== Gallery ==
Presented alphabetically by section:

=== Fore-and-aft ===
Catboat: single mast and sail, usually gunter- or gaff-rigged

Cutter: single mast with gaff-rigged mainsail, two headsails, and a gaff topsail above the gaff.

Dhow: single unstayed mast with lateen sail

Felucca: one to three lateen rigged masts

Gunter: sloop with gunter rig

Junk: one or more junk-rigged masts

Ketch: two masts with mizzen mast before the tiller

Lugger: two-masted lug rig

Proa: single mast with crab claw sail

Schooner: two or more fore-and-aft rigged masts, first mast no taller than the second

Sloop: single mast with a gaff-rigged mainsail and topsail on the mainmast

Yawl: two masts with mizzen mast aft of the tiller

=== Square ===
With square sails on every mast

Brig: two square-rigged masts and headsails

Fully rigged ship: three or more (all) square-rigged masts and headsails

=== Combination ===
With some masts having exclusively fore-and-aft sails

Barque: two or more square-rigged masts and headsails with fore-and-aft rigged aftmost mast

Barquentine: one square-rigged mast (fore) and two or more fore-and-aft rigged (main, mizzen, etc.) masts

Bilander: two masts, main mast course sail lateen rigged, all others square rigged

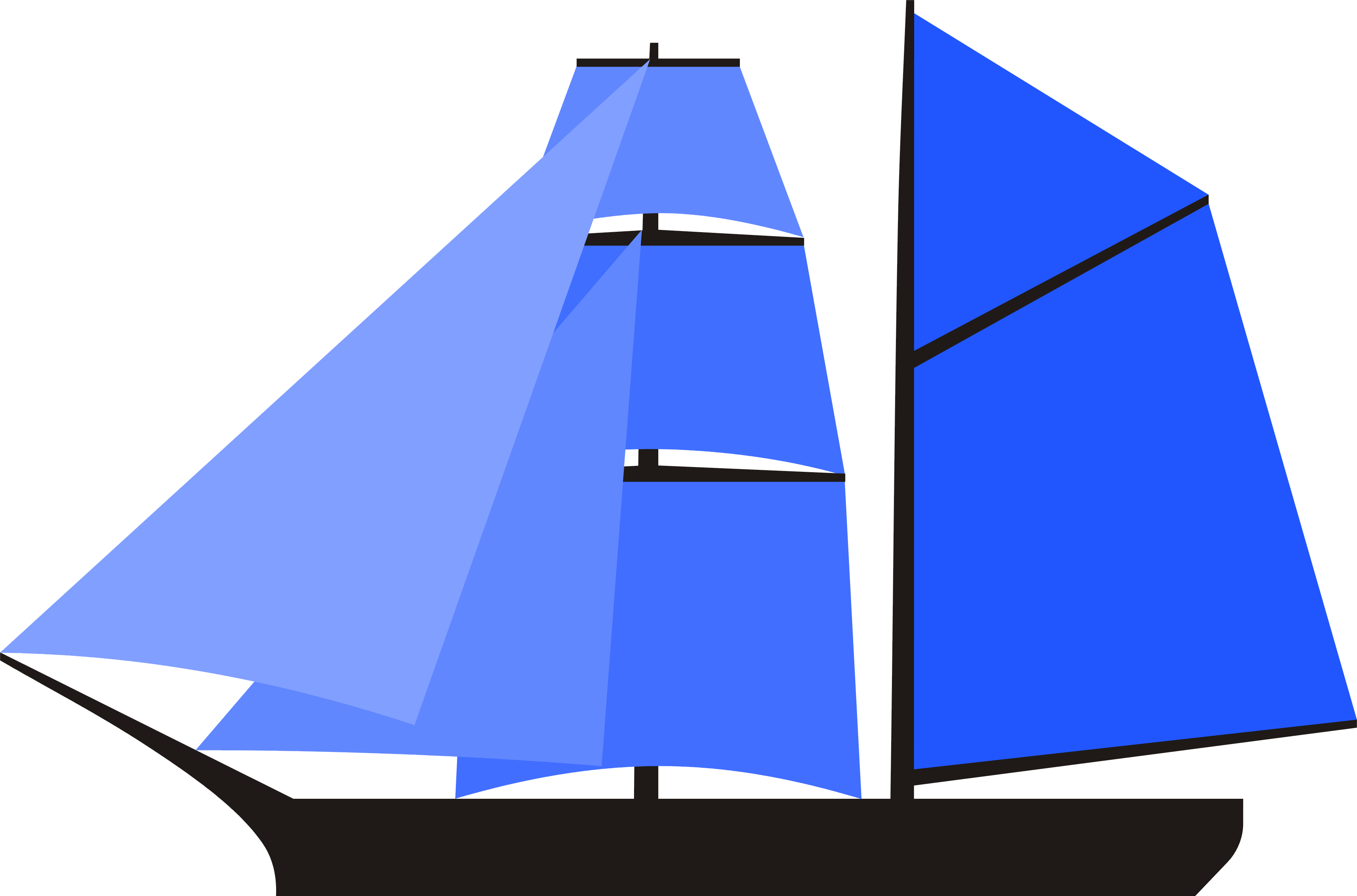
Schooner brig: one square-rigged foremast and one fore-and-aft rigged main mast

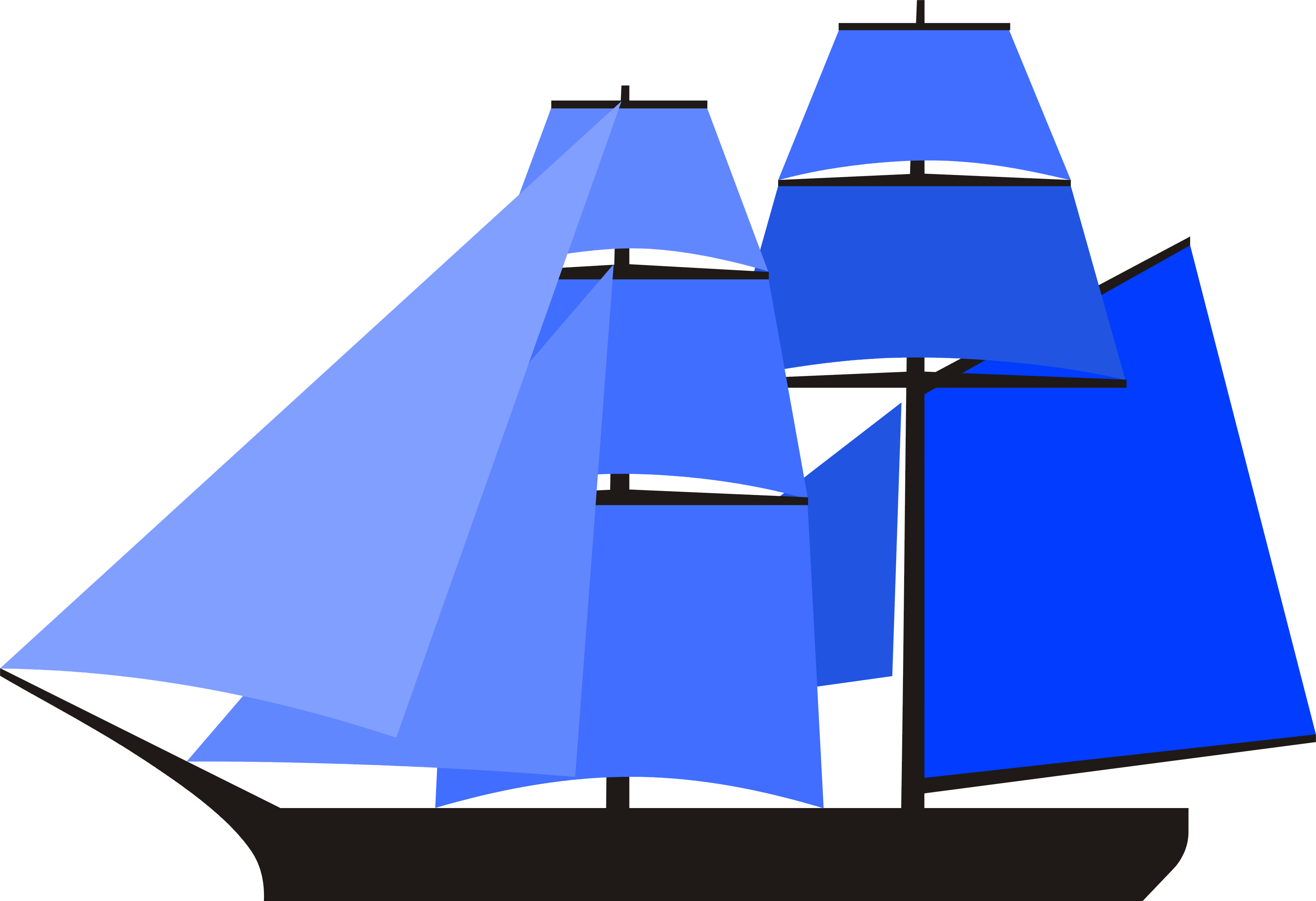
Brigantine: one square-rigged foremast and hybrid rigged main mast

Polacre: one square-rigged main with headsails and two lateen rigged aft masts

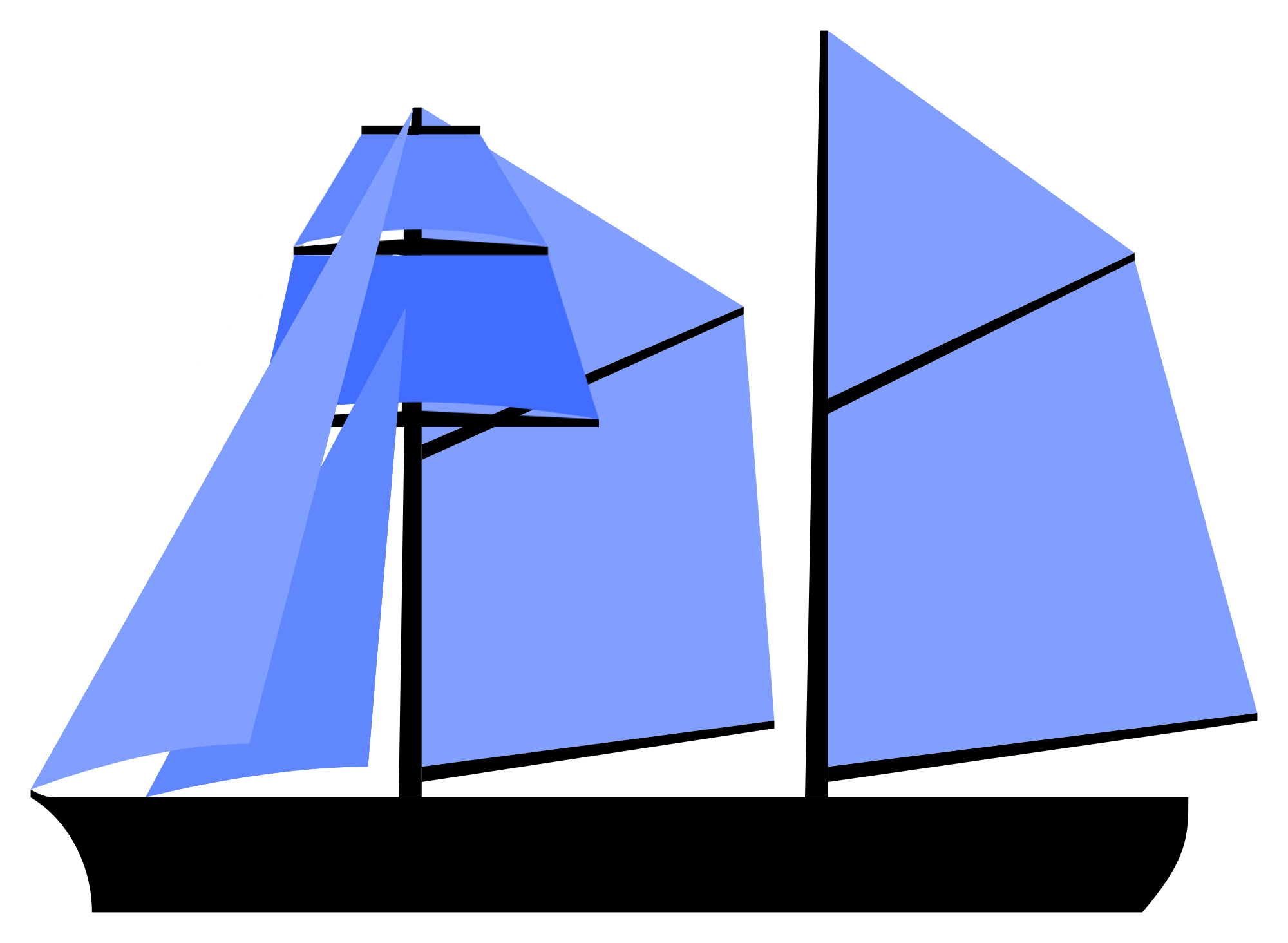
Topsail schooner: two schooner-rigged masts with one or more square-rigged topsails

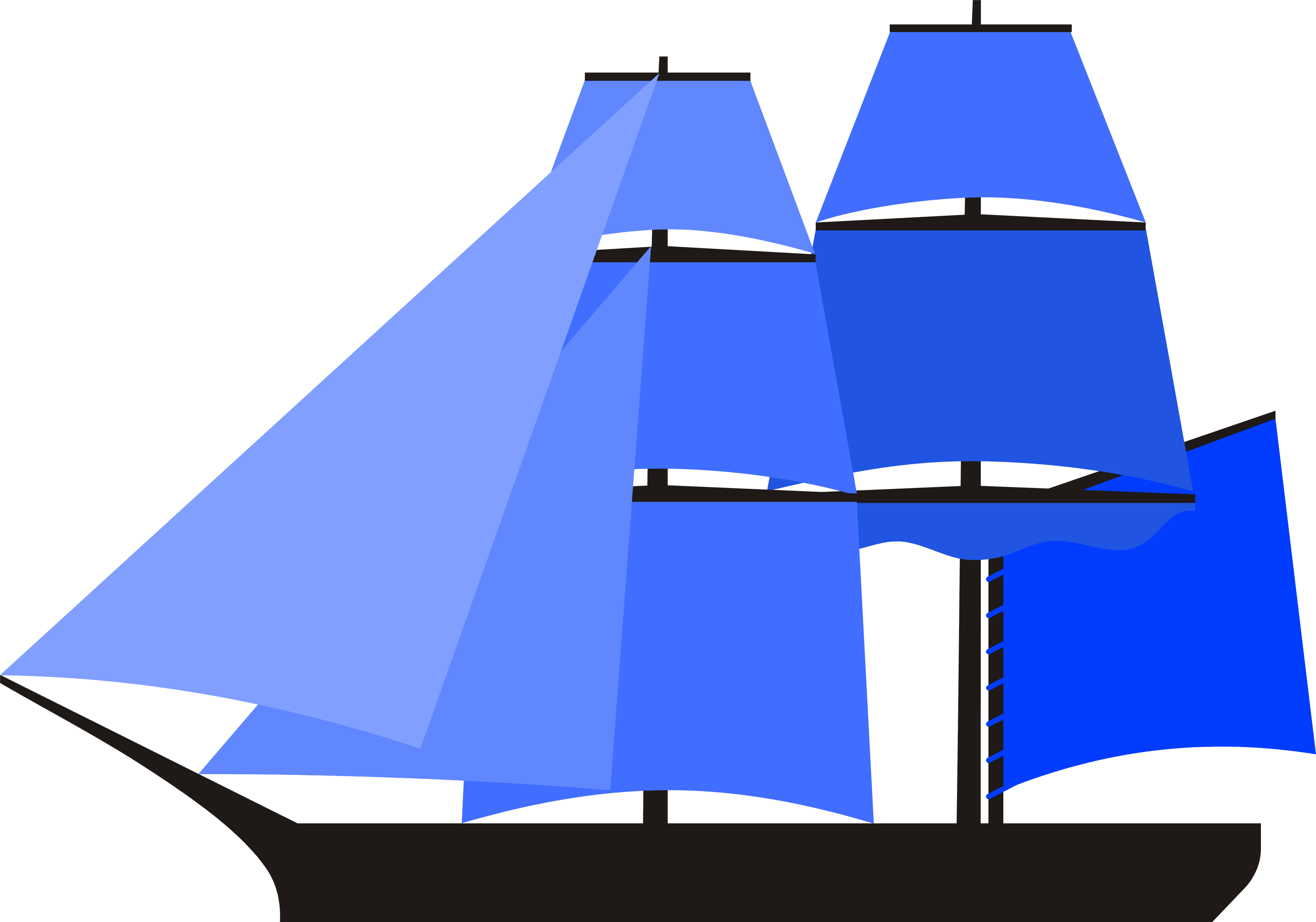
Snow: headsails, two square-rigged masts, and a third smaller 'snow-mast' with a trysail

== See also ==
- Glossary of nautical terms (A-L)
- Glossary of nautical terms (M-Z)
- Kite rig
