= Sailing vessel (disambiguation) =

A sailing vessel may be a:

- Barque
- Bilander
- Brig
- Brigantine
- Cat boat
- Cutter (boat)
- Dhow
- Full-rigged ship
- Iron-hulled sailing ship
- Ketch
- Kite board
- Lugger
- Proa
- Sailboat
- Sailing yacht
- Sailing ship
- Schooner
- Snow (ship)
- Windjammer
- Yawl
- Windsurfer

A sailing craft would further include a:

- Ice boat
- Land yacht
