= Beneteau Cyclades 51.5 =

Sailboat class

Development
- Designer: Berret-Racoupeau
- Location: France
- Year: 2005
- Builder: Beneteau
- Role: Cruiser
- Name: Beneteau Cyclades 51.5

Boat
- Displacement: 30,142 lb (13,672 kg)
- Draft: 6.58 ft (2.01 m)

Hull
- Type: monohull
- Construction: glassfibre
- LOA: 51.25 ft (15.62 m)
- Beam: 16.08 ft (4.90 m)
- Engine: Yanmar 4JH3-HTE 96 hp (72 kW) diesel engine

Hull appendages
- Keel: Fin keel
- Rudder: Spade-type rudder

Rig
- Rig type: Bermuda rig
- I foretriangle height: 59.32 ft (18.08 m)
- J foretriangle base: 17.88 ft (5.45 m)
- P mainsail luff: 55.12 ft (16.80 m)
- E mainsail foot: 20.34 ft (6.20 m)

Sails
- Sailplan: Masthead sloop
- Mainsail area: 560.57 sq ft (52.079 m^{2})
- Jib/genoa area: 530.32 sq ft (49.268 m^{2})
- Total sail area: 1,090.89 sq ft (101.347 m^{2})

The Beneteau Cyclades 51.5, or Cyclades 515, is a French sailboat that was designed by Berret-Racoupeau as a cruiser, primarily aimed at the yacht charter market and first built in 2005. The series is named for the Greek island chain.

The boat shares the same hull design as the Moorings 51.5, but has a different rig and keel.

== Production ==
The design was built by Beneteau in France, starting in 2005, but it is now out of production.

== Design ==
The Cyclades 51.5 is a recreational keelboat, built predominantly of glassfibre, with wood trim. It has a masthead sloop rig, with two sets of swept spreaders and aluminium spars with stainless steel wire standing rigging. The hull has a slightly raked stem, a walk-through reverse transom with a swimming platform, an internally mounted spade-type rudder controlled by dual wheels and a fixed fin keel with a weighted bulb. It displaces 30,142 lb (13,672 kg).

The boat has a draft of 6.58 ft (2.01 m) with the standard keel. It is fitted with a Japanese Yanmar 4JH3-HTE diesel engine of 96 hp (72 kW) for docking and manoeuvring.

The design has sleeping accommodation for nine people in five cabins. It has two forward cabins and two aft cabins, each with a double berth, plus a bow crew cabin with a single berth. The main salon has a U-shaped settee and a straight settee. The galley is located on the port side of the main salon, amidships. The galley is of straight configuration and is equipped with a stove, a refrigerator, freezer and a double sink. A navigation station is in the aft part of the salon, on the starboard side. There are five heads, one for each cabin.

== Operational history ==
In a 2007 review in Cruising World, Mark Pillsbury wrote, "given our morning's boisterous sail, we went for a reef in the 51.5’s main and a not-quite-full genoa as we took a right leaving Road Harbour, headed for Thatch Island Cut and Jost Van Dyke. This afternoon, Rebecca settled in at the port wheel and did the driving. Unlike the cat[amaran], where the person steering often found herself alone, most of us now sat under the bimini in the cockpit, and a couple of others sunned on deck. Twin helms give you easy access to the 51.5's roomy cockpit, with its fixed centerline table that has room inside for gear and doubles as a good brace when heeled. Checking our speed over the ground, I was surprised to see we were within a knot of what the cat was making in similar winds that morning. Walking about on deck, even though we heeled a bit, the boat felt steady under foot, while I recalled that it took some getting used to the quicker movements of the cat[amaran] when it pitched in the chop."

== See also ==
- List of sailing boat types
