= Full-rigged ship =

Sailing vessel with three or more square-rigged masts

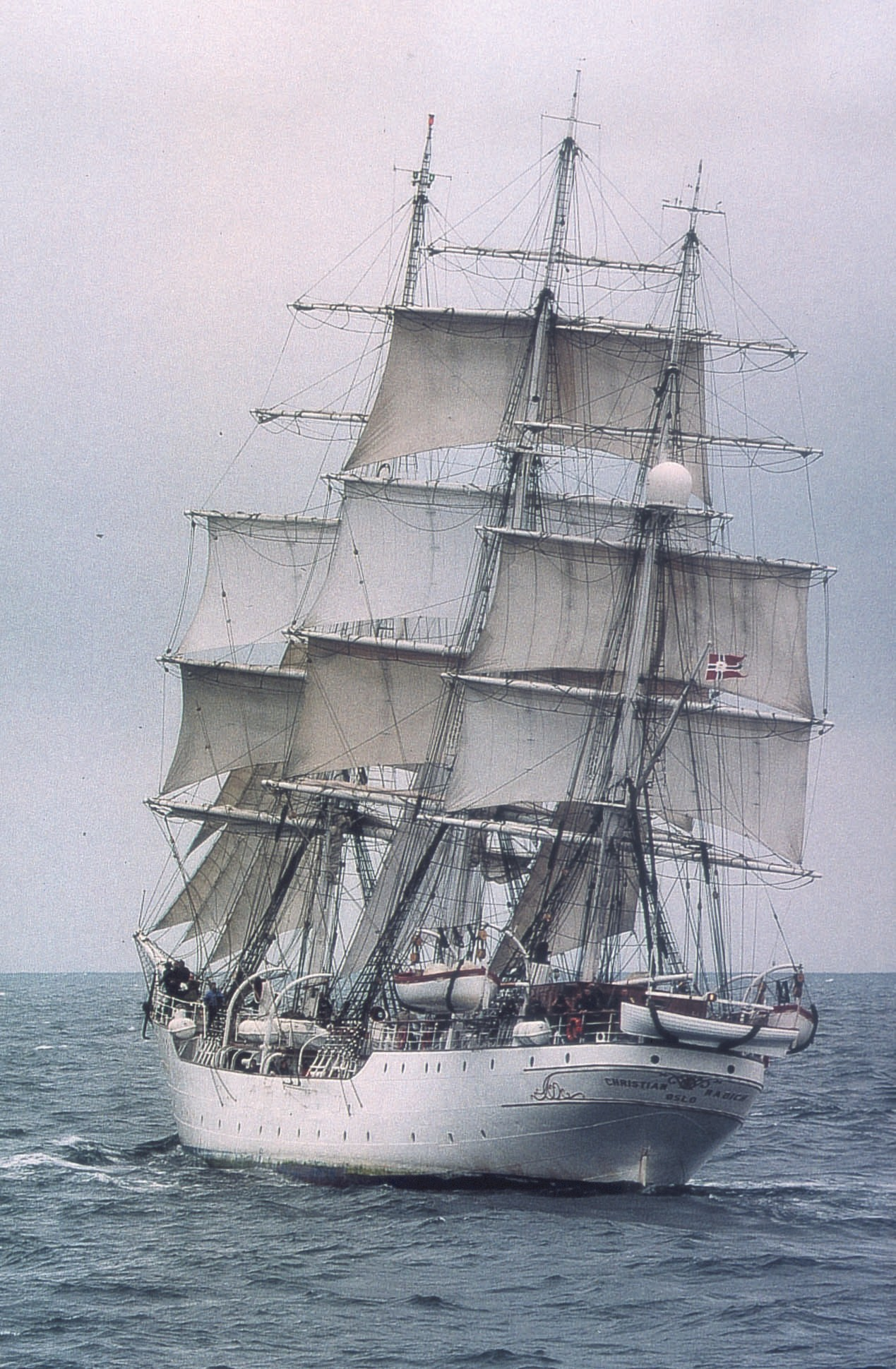
Full-rigged sailing ship Christian Radich

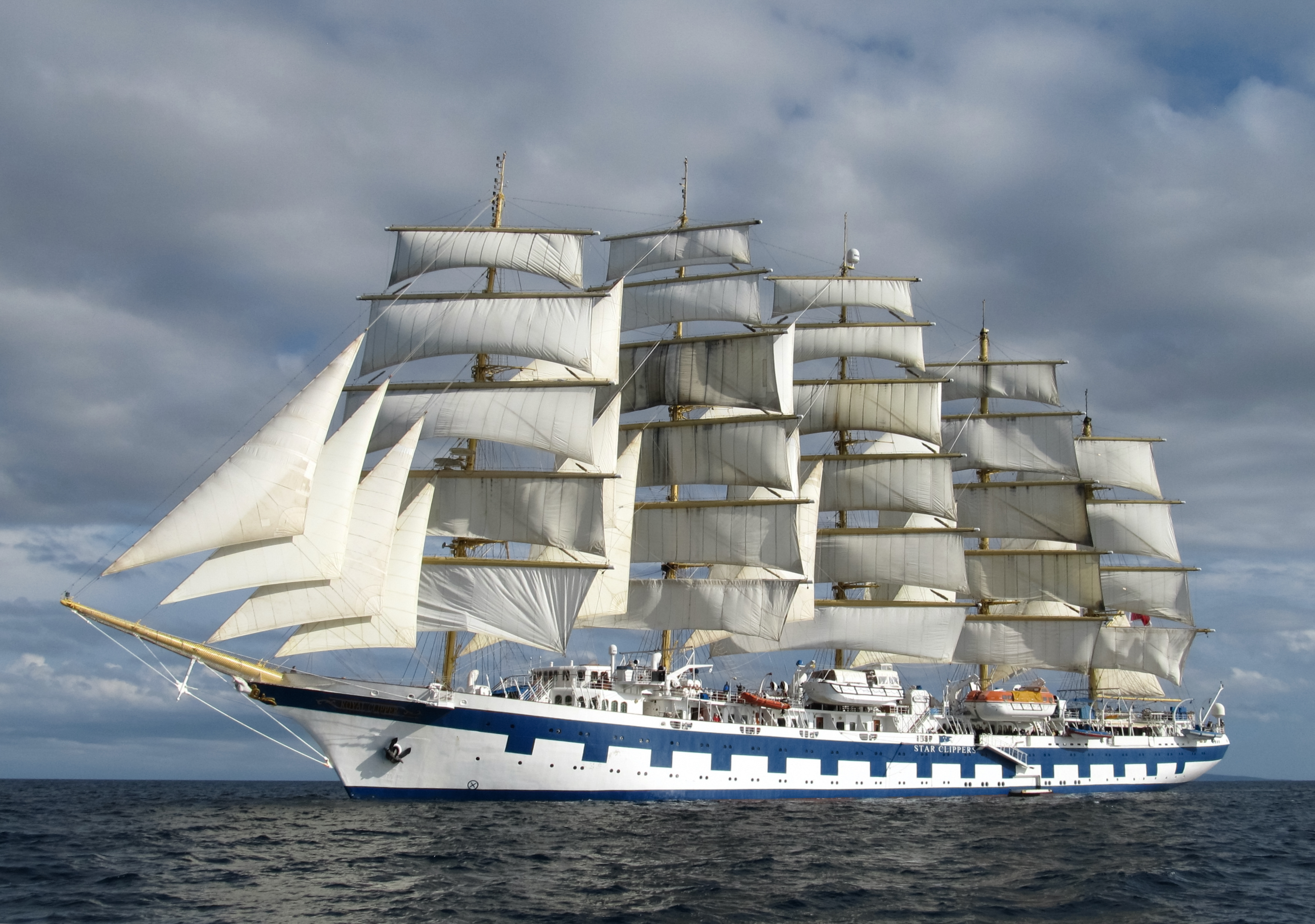
Full-rigged sailing ship Royal Clipper

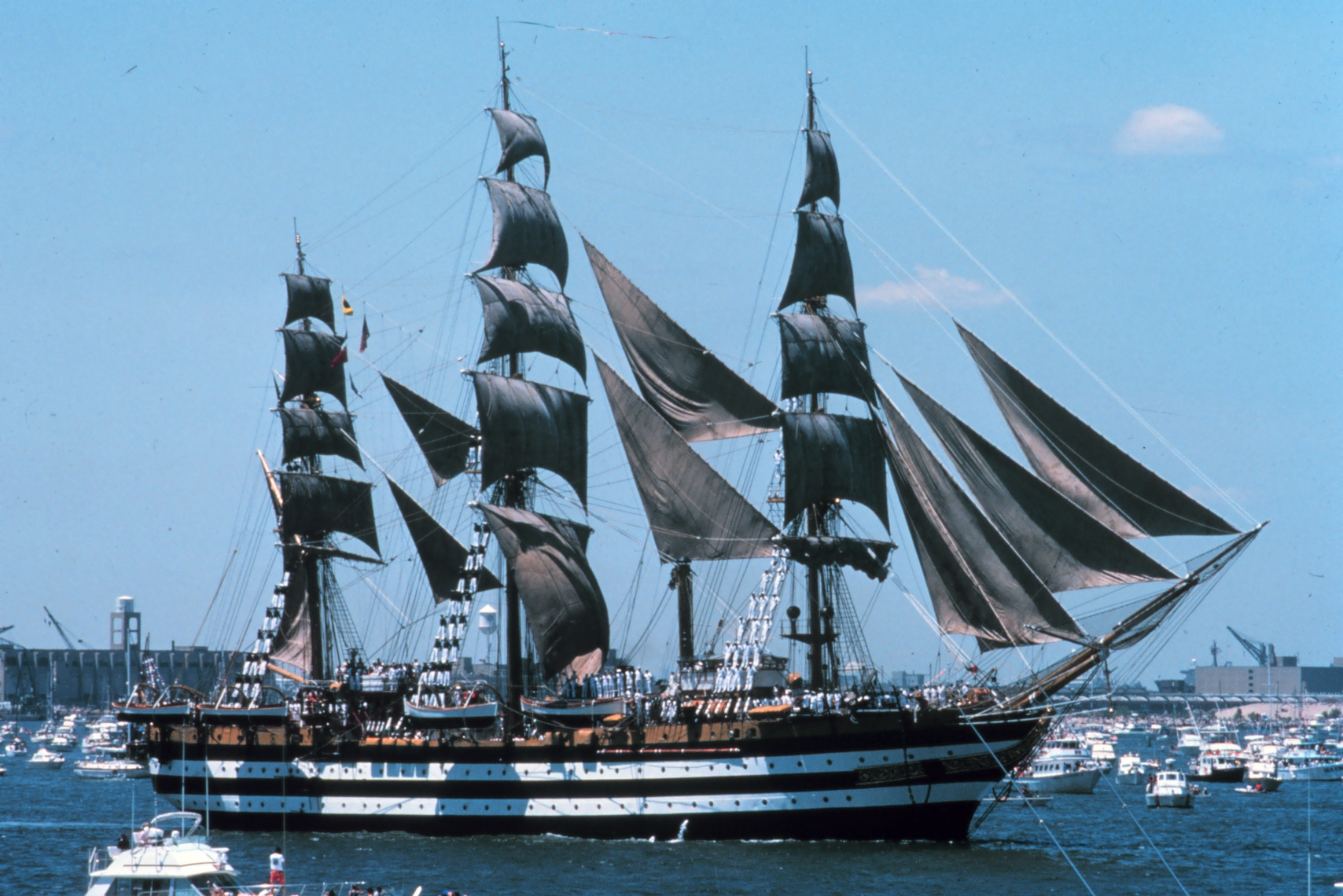
Amerigo Vespucci, full-rigged ship of the Italian Marina Militare

A full-rigged ship or fully rigged ship is a sailing vessel with a sail plan of three or more masts, all of them square-rigged. Such a vessel is said to have a ship rig or be ship-rigged, with each mast stepped in three segments: lower, top, and topgallant.

== Masts ==
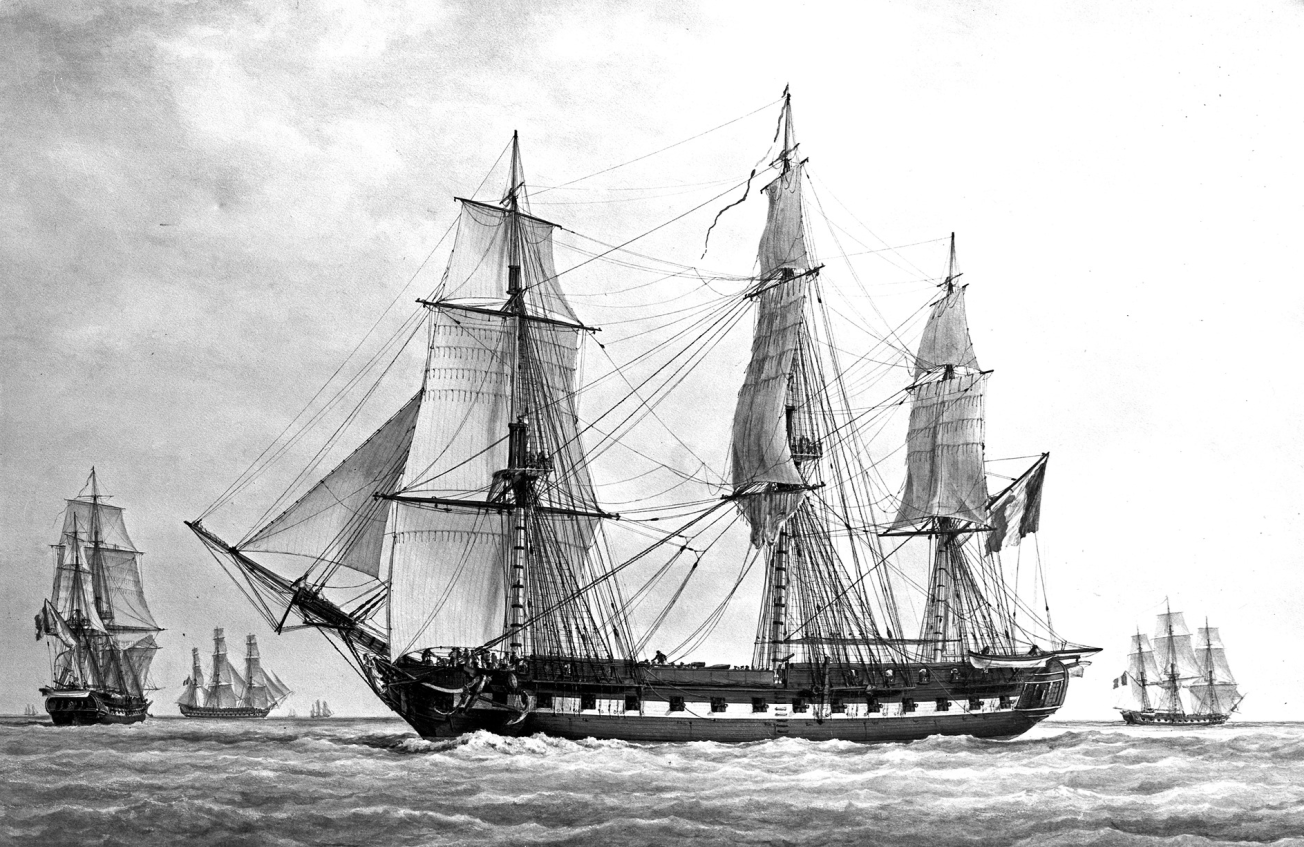
The French Imperial Navy full-rigged ship Pénélope, launched in 1806

The masts of a full-rigged ship, from bow to stern, are:

- Foremast, which is the second tallest mast
- Mainmast, the tallest
- Mizzenmast, the third tallest
- Jiggermast, which may not be present but will be fourth tallest if so

If the masts are of wood, each mast is in three or more pieces. They are (in order, from bottom up):

- The mast or the lower.
- Topmast
- Topgallant mast
- Royal mast, if fitted

On steel-masted vessels, the masts are not constructed in the same way, but the corresponding sections of the mast are still named after the traditional wooden sections.

== Sails ==
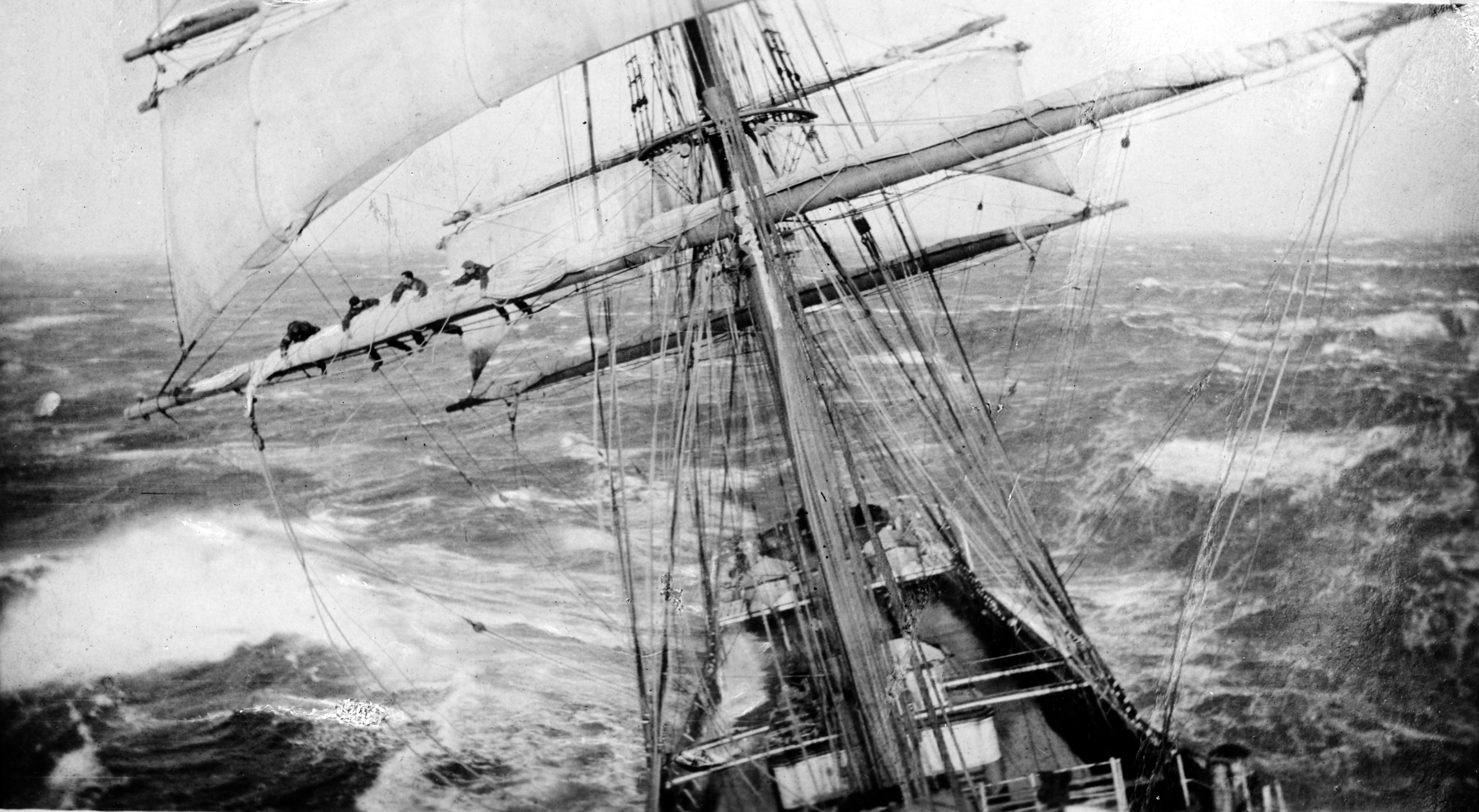
Ship Garthsnaid at sea, c. 1920

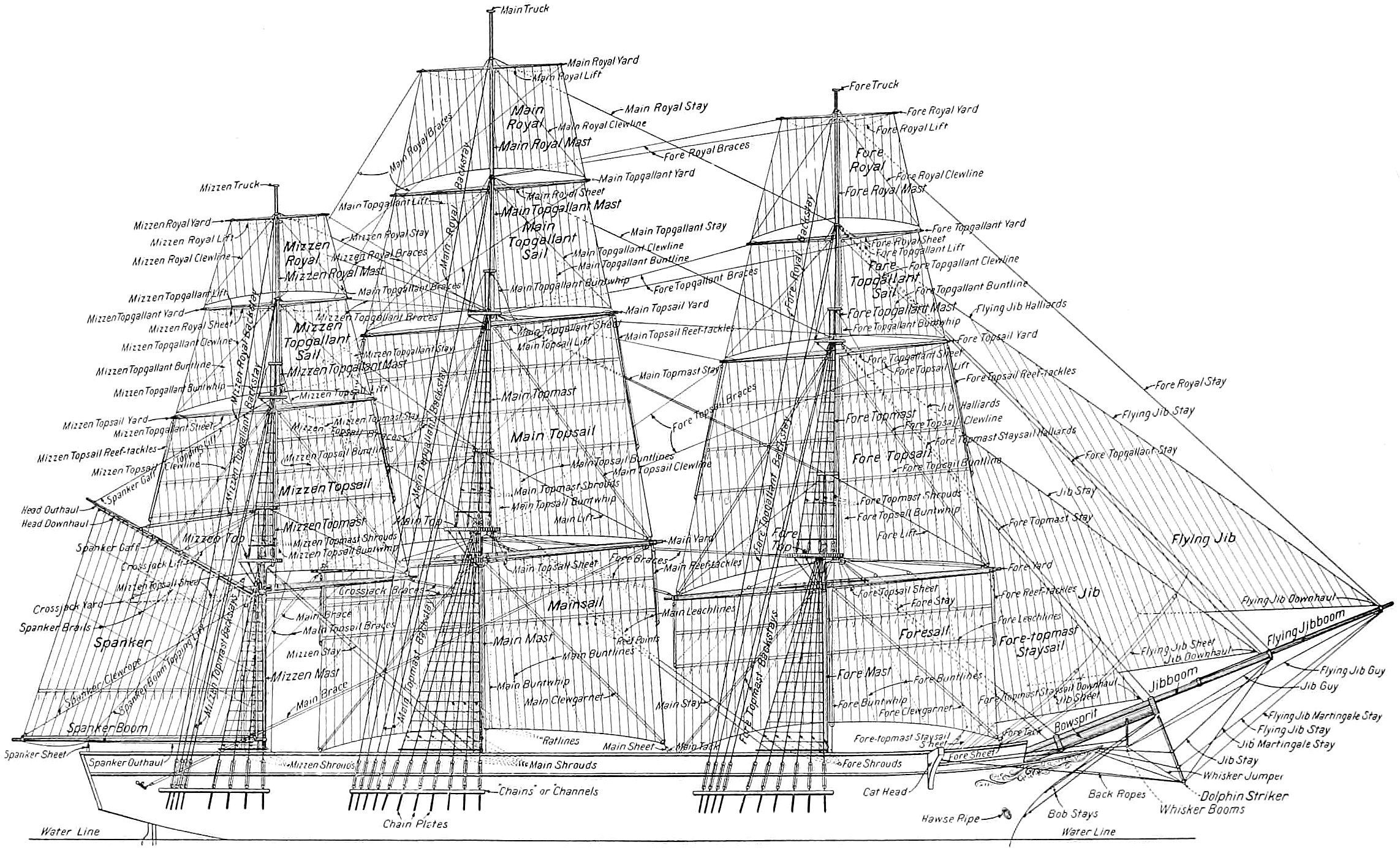
Names of sails

The lowest and normally largest sail on a mast is the course sail of that mast, and is referred to simply by the mast name: Foresail, mainsail, mizzen sail, jigger sail or more commonly forecourse etc.

Even a full-rigged ship did not usually have a lateral (square) course on the mizzen mast below the mizzen topmast. Instead, the lowest sail on the mizzen was usually a fore/aft sail—originally a lateen sail, but later a gaff sail called a spanker or driver. The key distinction between a ship and a barque (in modern usage) is that a ship carries a square-rigged mizzen topsail (and therefore that its mizzen mast has a topsail yard and a cross-jack yard) whereas the mizzen mast of a barque has only fore-and-aft rigged sails. The cross-jack yard was the lowest yard on a ship's mizzen mast. Unlike the corresponding yards on the fore and main mast it did not usually have fittings to hang a sail from: its purpose was to control the lower edge of the topsail. In the rare case, the cross-jack yard did carry a square sail, that sail would be called the cross-jack rather than the mizzen course.

The full set of sails, in order from bottom to top, are:

- Course sail,
- Topsail, or
  - Lower topsail, if fitted.
  - Upper topsail, if fitted.
- Topgallant sail, or
  - Lower topgallant sail, if fitted.
  - Upper topgallant sail, if fitted.
- Royal sail, if fitted.
- Skysail, if fitted.
- Moonraker, if fitted.

The division of a sail into upper and lower sails was a matter of practicality, since undivided sails were larger and, consequently, more difficult to handle. Larger sails necessitated hiring, and paying, a larger crew. Additionally, the great size of some late-19th and 20th century vessels meant that their correspondingly large sails would have been impossible to handle had they not been divided.

Jibs are carried forward of the foremast, are tacked down on the bowsprit or jib-boom and have varying naming conventions.

Staysails may be carried between any other mast and the one in front of it or from the foremast to the bowsprit. They are named after the mast from which they are hoisted, so for example a staysail hoisted to the top of the mizzen topgallant on a stay running to the top of the main topmast would be called the mizzen topgallant staysail.

Evolution of ship rigging
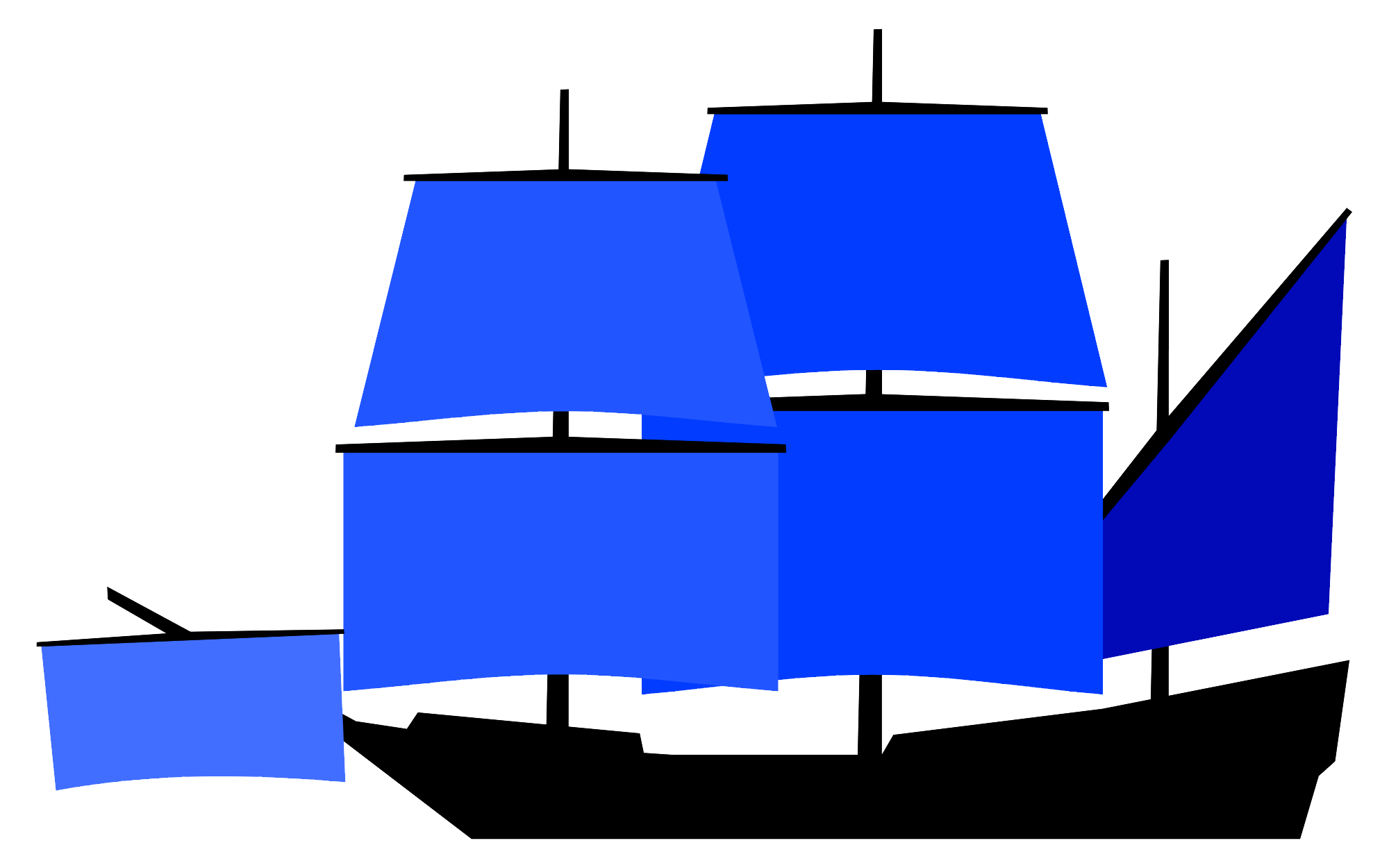
Carrack (16–17th centuries), precursor to full-rigged ship

Full-rigged ship (mid-19th century—with one sail furled on mizzenmast)

In light winds studding sails (pronounced "stunsls") may be carried on either side of any or all of the square rigged sails except royals and skysails. They are named after the adjacent sail and the side of the vessel on which they are set, for example main topgallant starboard stu'nsail. One or more spritsails may also be set on booms set athwart and below the bowsprit.

One or two spankers are carried aft of the aftmost mast, if two they are called the upper spanker and lower spanker. A fore-and-aft topsail may be carried above the upper or only spanker, and is called the gaff sail.

To stop a full-rigged ship, except when running directly down wind, the sails of the foremast are oriented in the direction perpendicular to those of the mainmast. Thus, the masts cancel out of their push on the ship. This allows the crew to stop and quickly restart the ship without retracting and lowering the sails, and to dynamically compensate for the push of the wind on the masts themselves and the yards. Running downwind the sails still need to be lowered to bring the ship to a halt.

== See also ==
- Glossary of nautical terms (A–L)
- Glossary of nautical terms (M–Z)
- Rigging
- Sail
- Sail-plan
- Types of sailing ships

== Bibliography ==
- Willaumez, Jean-Baptiste-Philibert (1825). Dictionnaire de marine (in French). Bachelier.
