= Moorings 51.5 =

Sailboat class

Development
- Designer: Berret-Racoupeau
- Location: France
- Year: 2005
- Builder: Beneteau
- Role: Cruiser
- Name: Moorings 51.5

Boat
- Displacement: 30,142 lb (13,672 kg)
- Draft: 6.58 ft (2.01 m)

Hull
- Type: monohull
- Construction: glassfibre
- LOA: 51.25 ft (15.62 m)
- LWL: 49.75 ft (15.16 m)
- Beam: 16.08 ft (4.90 m)
- Engine: Yanmar 100 hp (75 kW) diesel engine

Hull appendages
- Keel: Fin keel with weighted bulb
- Rudder: Spade-type rudder

Rig
- Rig type: Bermuda rig

Sails
- Sailplan: Fractional rigged sloop
- Total sail area: 1,184 sq ft (110.0 m^{2})

The Moorings 51.5 is a French sailboat that was designed by Berret-Racoupeau as a cruiser for the yacht charter market, with Moorings Yacht Charter as the fleet customer and first built in 2005.

The boat shares the same hull design as the Beneteau Cyclades 51.5, but has a different rig and keel.

== Production ==
The design was built by Beneteau in France, starting in 2005, but it is now out of production.

== Design ==
The Moorings 51.5 is a recreational keelboat, built predominantly of glassfibre, with wood trim. It has a fractional sloop rig, with two sets of swept spreaders and aluminium spars with stainless steel wire standing rigging. The hull has a slightly raked stem, a reverse transom with a swimming platform, an internally mounted spade-type rudder controlled by dual wheels and a fixed fin keel with a weighted bulb. It displaces 30,142 lb (13,672 kg).

The boat has a draft of 6.58 ft (2.01 m) with the standard keel.

The boat is fitted with a Japanese Yanmar diesel engine of 100 hp (75 kW) for docking and manoeuvring. The fuel tank holds 114 U.S. gallons (430 L; 95 imp gal) and the fresh water tank has a capacity of 246 U.S. gallons (930 L; 205 imp gal).

The design has sleeping accommodation for nine people in five cabins. It has two cabins forward and two cabins aft, each equipped with a double berth, plus a single berth for crew in the bow. The main salon has a U-shaped settee and a straight settee around a table. The galley is located on the port side of the salon and is of straight configuration. The galley is equipped with a stove, a refrigerator, freezer and a double sink. A navigation station is located in the main salon, aft, on the starboard side. There are five heads, one for each cabin.

The design has a hull speed of 9.45 kn (17.50 km/h).

== Operational history ==
In a 2007 Cruising World review, Andrew Burton wrote, "the boat sailed well in the light airs of my test sail. With the jib winches just forward of the helm on either side, it was easy to operate singlehanded. While the interior isn't optimized for long-range cruising, a buyer for the 51.5 will plan to use the boat with friends or a large family, just as charterers will enjoy the boat the rest of the time."

== See also ==
- List of sailing boat types
