= Moonraker (sail) =

Sail

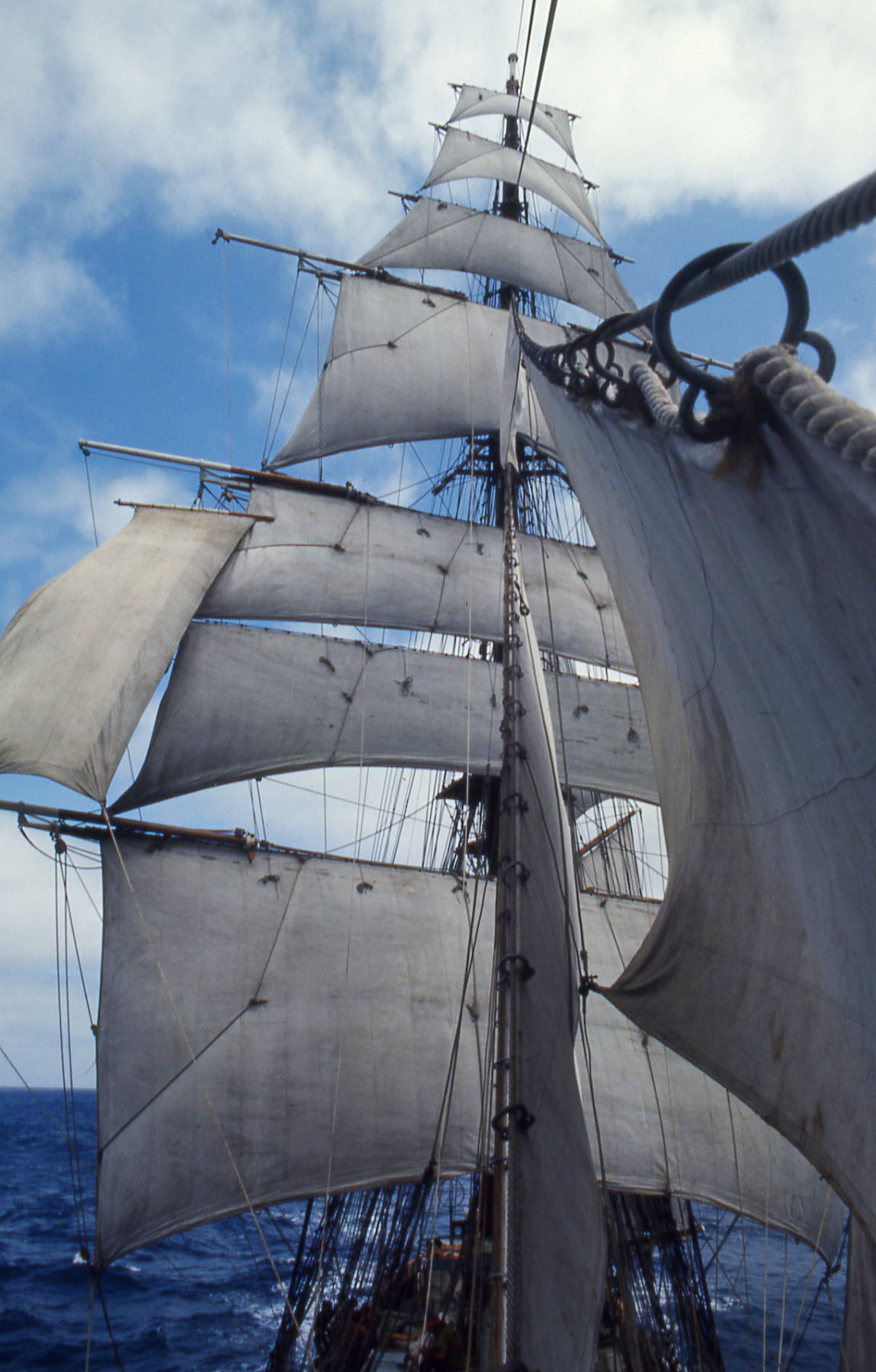
Regina Maris: the highest sail is a moonsail, below that a skysail and next a royal sail

A moonraker, also known as a moonsail, hope-in-heaven, or hopesail, is a square sail flown immediately above a skysail (see sail-plan) on the royal masts of a square-rigged sailing ship. None of the four- and five-masted square-rigged ships carried a moonsail.

The equivalent sail, if triangular, is called a skyscraper.

Moonrakers are relatively unusual sails only used on ships built primarily for speed.
