= Skysail =

A skysail is the uppermost sail in many old square-rigged sail-plans (though sometimes topped by a moonsail). It was also on the royal mast above the royal sail. It was typically used in light winds.

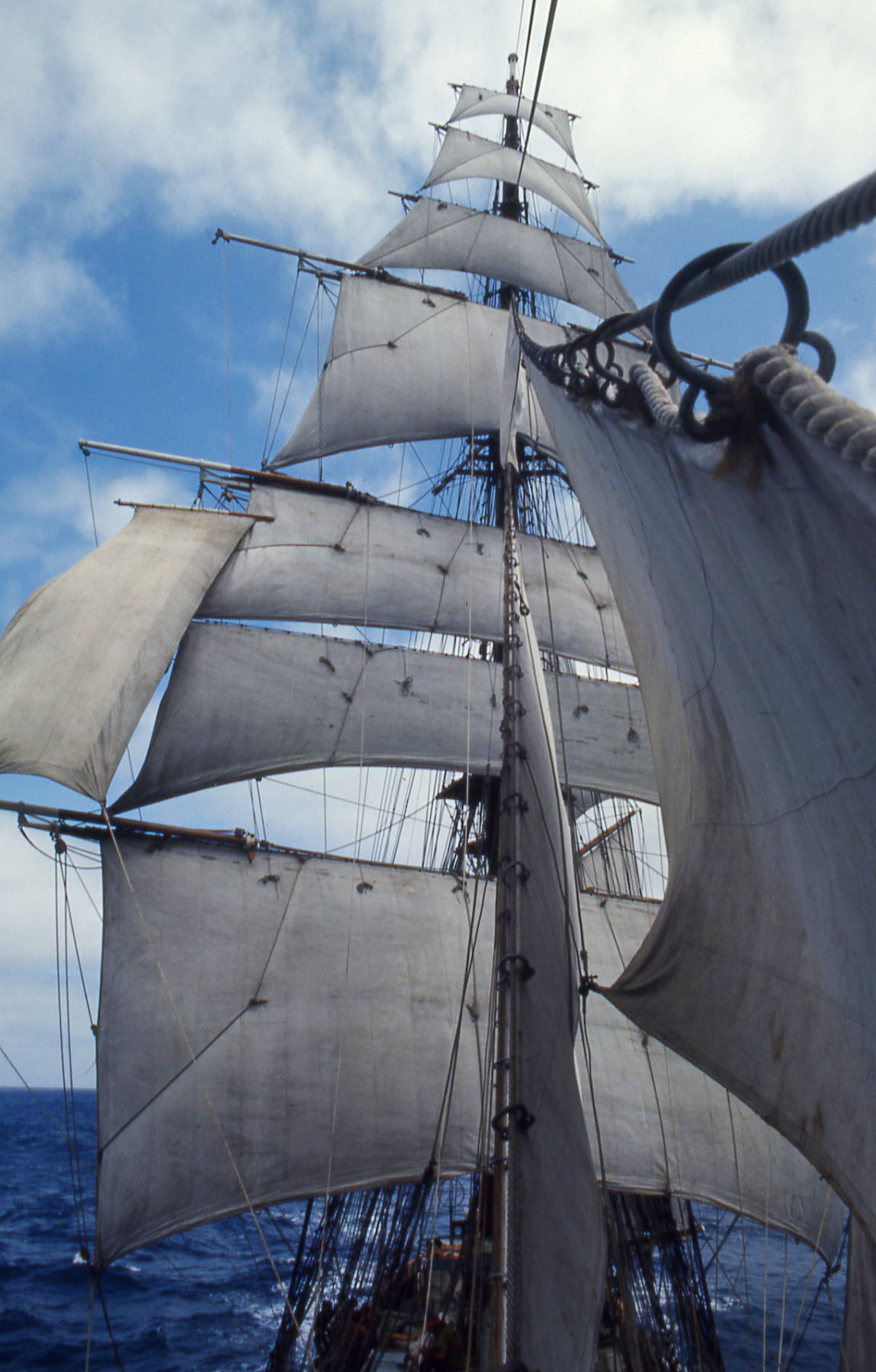
The highest sail is moonraker, lower skysail and royal sail.

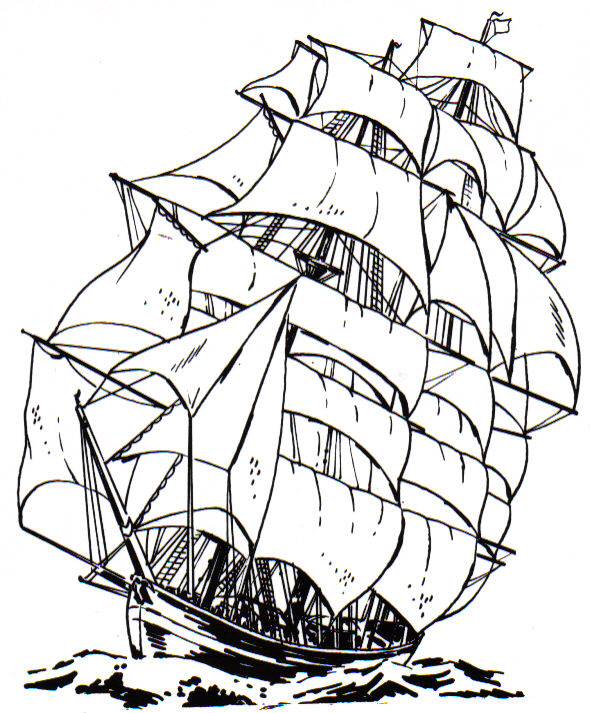
Skysail is the highest on the main (middle) mast.

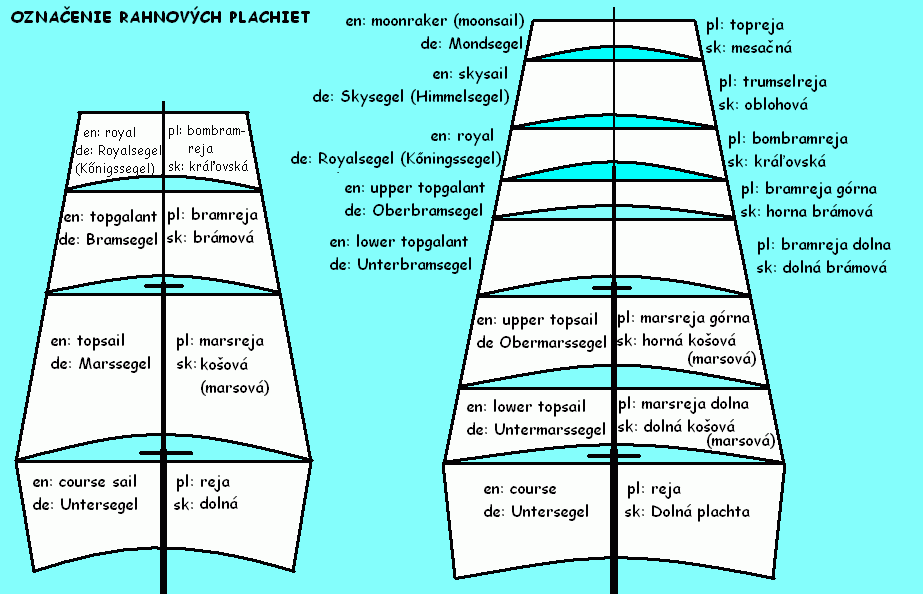

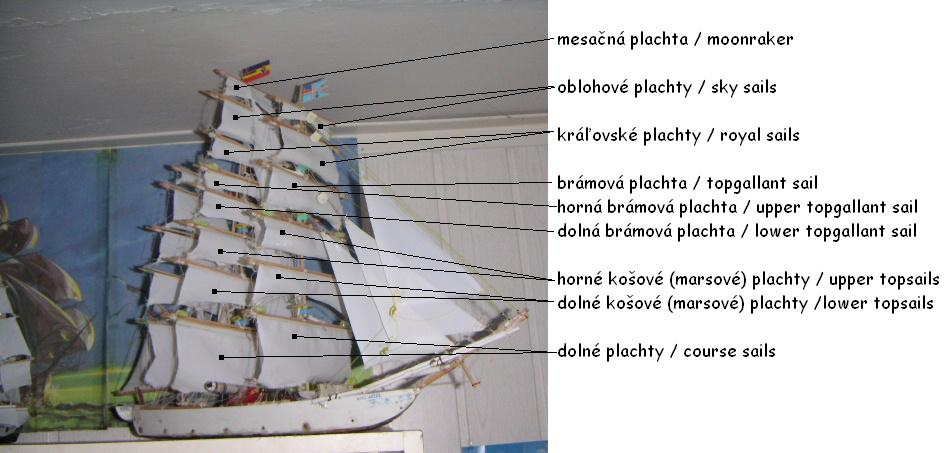
