= Bilander =

Type of ship

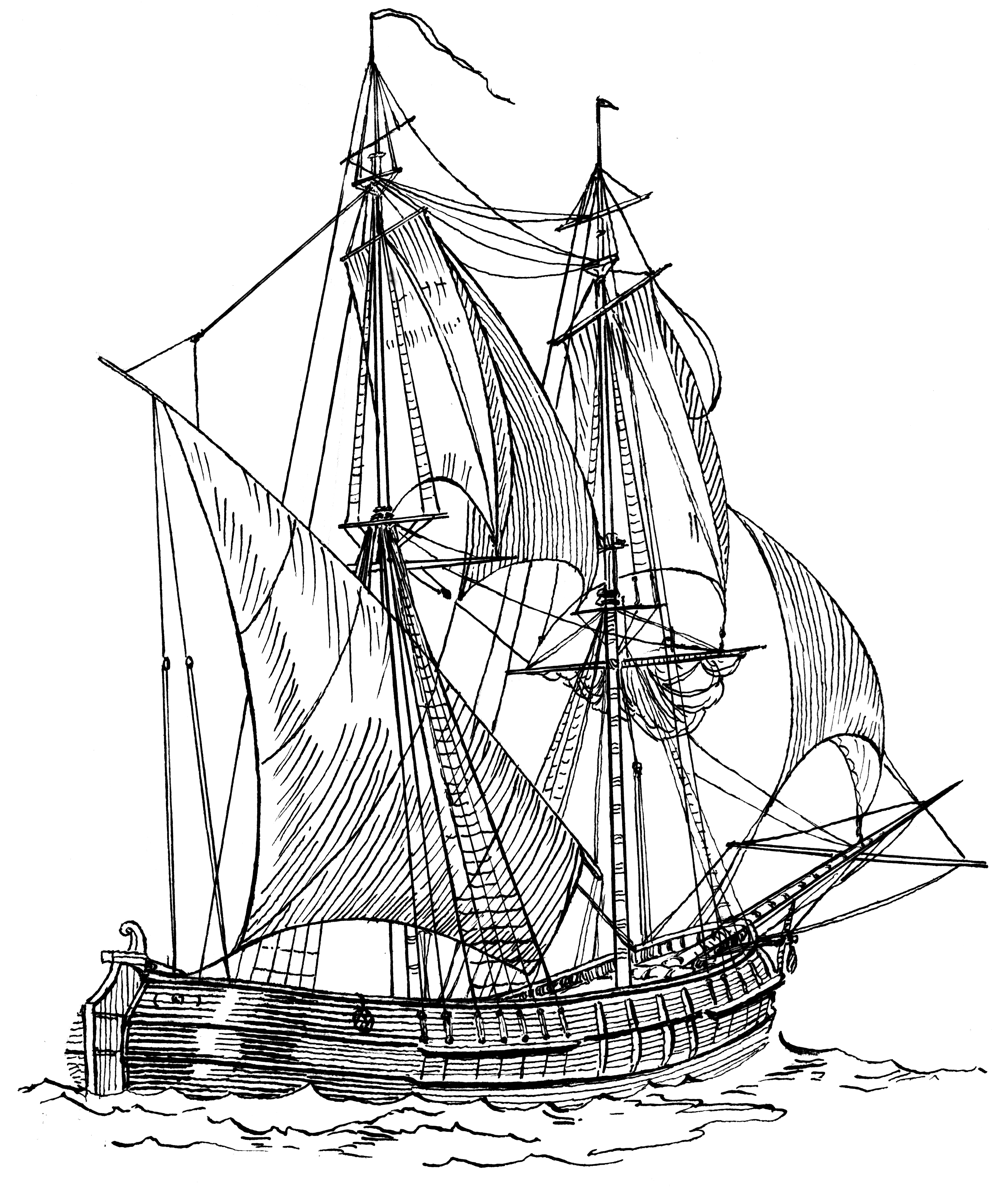
An illustration of a bilander

Rig diagram

The bilander, also spelled billander or bélandre, is a two-masted vessel. The foremast is fully square rigged, but its taller mainmast has a long lateen mainsail yard with a corresponding trapezoidal sail and rig inclined at about 45°, with square rigs on the yards above that. The lowermost is secured at the corners by a crossjack.

== History ==
A bilander was a small European merchant ship with two masts. It was used in the Netherlands for coast and canal traffic and occasionally seen in the North Sea but more frequently in the Mediterranean Sea. In England, the use of the bilander can be dated back as far as the reign of Queen Elizabeth. The mainmast was lateen-rigged with a trapezoidal mainsail, but the foremast carried the conventional square course and square topsail. Displacement was typically under 100 tons. However, the design was eventually replaced by more efficient sailing ship designs, leading it to be regarded as simply a precursor/forerunner to the brig. The design was popular in the Mediterranean Sea, as well as around New England in the first half of the 18th century, but was soon surpassed by better designs. Few examples survive.
