= Sail plan =

Drawing showing the arrangement of sails

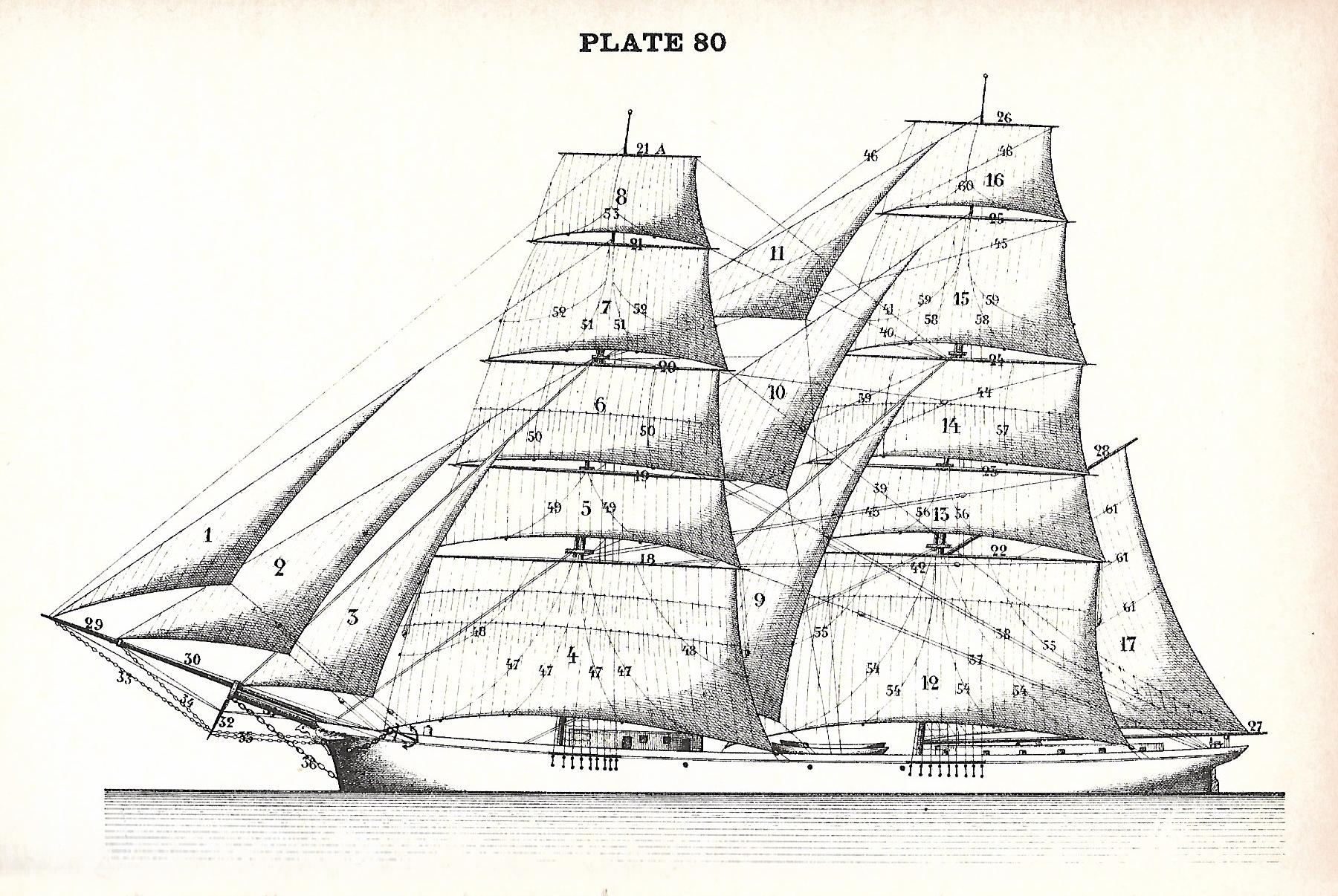
Sail plan of a brig

A sail plan is a drawing of a sailing craft, viewed from the side, depicting its sails, the spars that carry them and some of the rigging that supports the rig. By extension, "sail plan" describes the arrangement of sails on a craft. A sailing craft may be waterborne (a ship or boat), an iceboat, or a sail-powered land vehicle.

== Purpose ==
Sail plan of a sloop

Depending on the level of detail, a sail plan can be a visual inventory of the suit of sails that a sailing craft has, or it may be part of a construction drawing. The sail plan may provide the basis for calculating the center of effort on a sailing craft, necessary to compare with the center of resistance from the hull in the water or the wheels or runners on hard surfaces. Such a calculation involves the area of each sail and its geometric center, referenced from a specific point.

=== Sail inventory ===
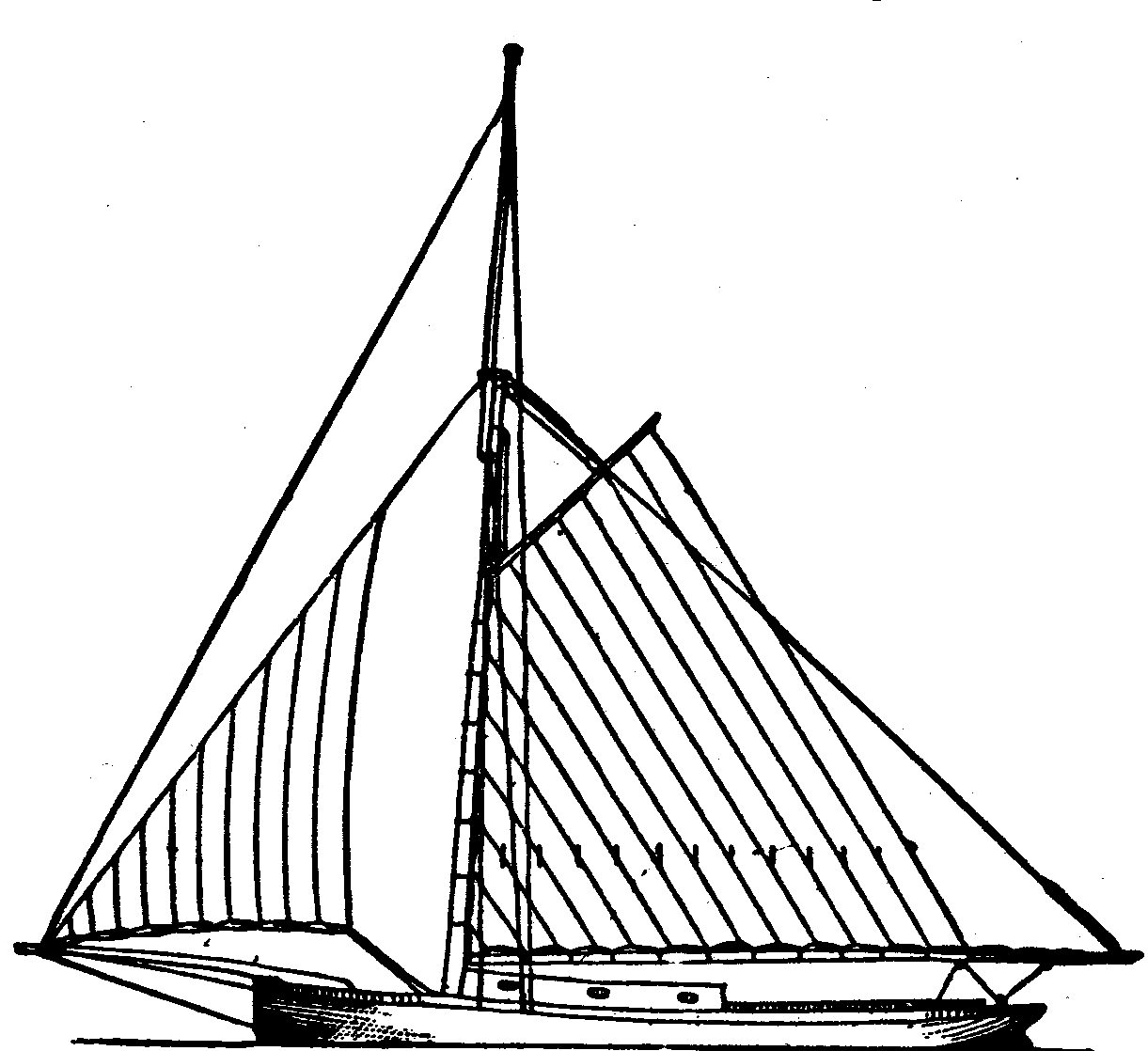
Sail plan of a gaff-rigged sloop showing reefed sails

Considerations for a sail inventory in a yacht include the type of sailing (cruising, racing, passage-making, etc.) and the weather conditions anticipated. An assessment starts with a sail plan that depicts each kind of sail under consideration. The sail plan becomes a guide for which sails to use under the anticipated weather conditions, while under way. Sail names encompass fore-and-aft rigs, square rigs, and rigs that encompass both types.

==== Fore-and-aft rig ====
A cutter-rigged yacht, intended for off-shore sailing might have a sail inventory that includes: a mainsail, a roller furling genoa, and a working staysail for most wind conditions, and, for strong winds, a storm staysail and trysail. Sails for lighter winds would include a spinnaker, a drifter, and a mainsail with lighter sail cloth.

Each sail has a separate set of considerations within the plan, for example with a performance sloop one may consider the following about its suit of sails:

- Mainsail: Lazy jacks, reefing points and battens
- Jib: Roller furling or reefing
- Spinnakers and drifters: Draft, weight and (a)symmetry address their applications

==== Square rig ====
A square-rigged sailing vessel carries both fore-and-aft sails, the jibs, staysails and mizzen sail, and square sails. Their naming conventions are:

- For jibs, attached to a bowsprit, (from forward, aftwards): flying, outer, and inner jibs, and the fore-topmast staysail, forestaysail, and foresail.
- For staysails between the foremast and the mainmast (from bottom to top): main, main-topmast, main-topgallant, and main-royal (...staysail). Staysails between other masts are similarly named.
- The mizzen sail (or "spanker") is a gaff-rigged, fore-and-aft sail, mounted on the after side of the mizzenmast. It was used to help tack the vessel.
- For square sails (from bottom to top): (fore, main, mizzen) ...sail, lower topsail, upper topsail, topgallant, royal, skysail.

== Choice of rig ==
In the late 19th and early 20th centuries, choosing a sail plan for a displacement watercraft stemmed from the size and tonnage of the vessel, its purpose (working vessel, cargo vessel or yacht) and the anticipated winds in the region where it was expected to sail. In that period, sail plans might start from smallest to largest boat or ship in a hierarchy of sailing rigs:

Yachts

- Catboat with a single sail
- Sloop with mainsail and jib
- Yawl with a small mast behind the steering post
- Ketch with a mizzenmast ahead of the steering post

Working boats and coastal freighters

- Cutter with a single mast and multiple headsails
- Schooner with two or more masts

Ocean-going merchant vessels

- Brig with two square-rigged masts
- Brigantine with square-rigged foremast and fore-and aft mizzen
- Barque with two square-rigged masts and a fore-and-aft mizzen
- Barquentine with one square-rigged mast and two fore-and-aft masts behind
- Full-rigged ship with three or more masts with square sails on each

== Gallery ==
The following sail plans are at various scales.

Gaff and square-rigged sailing craft

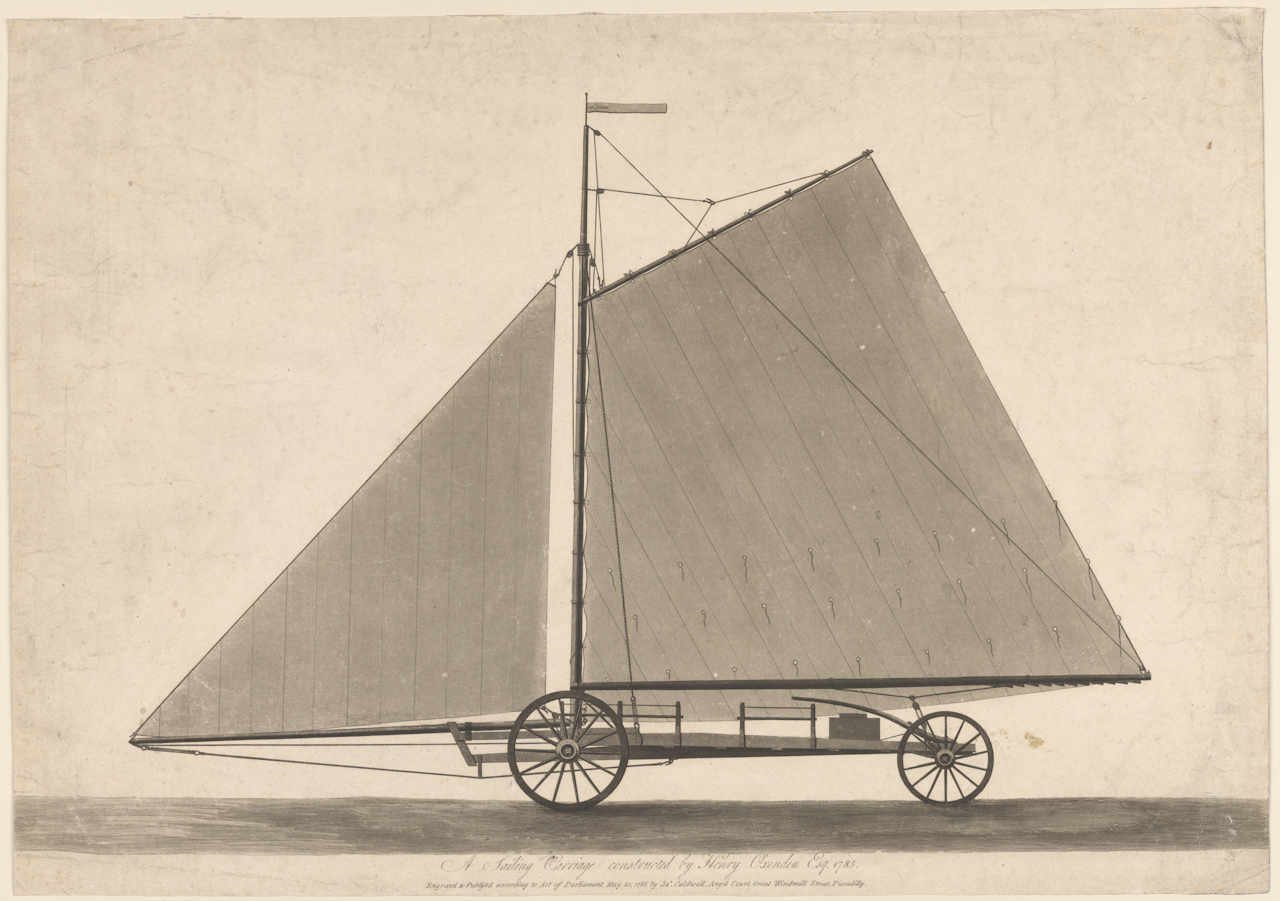
"Sailing carriage", 1785

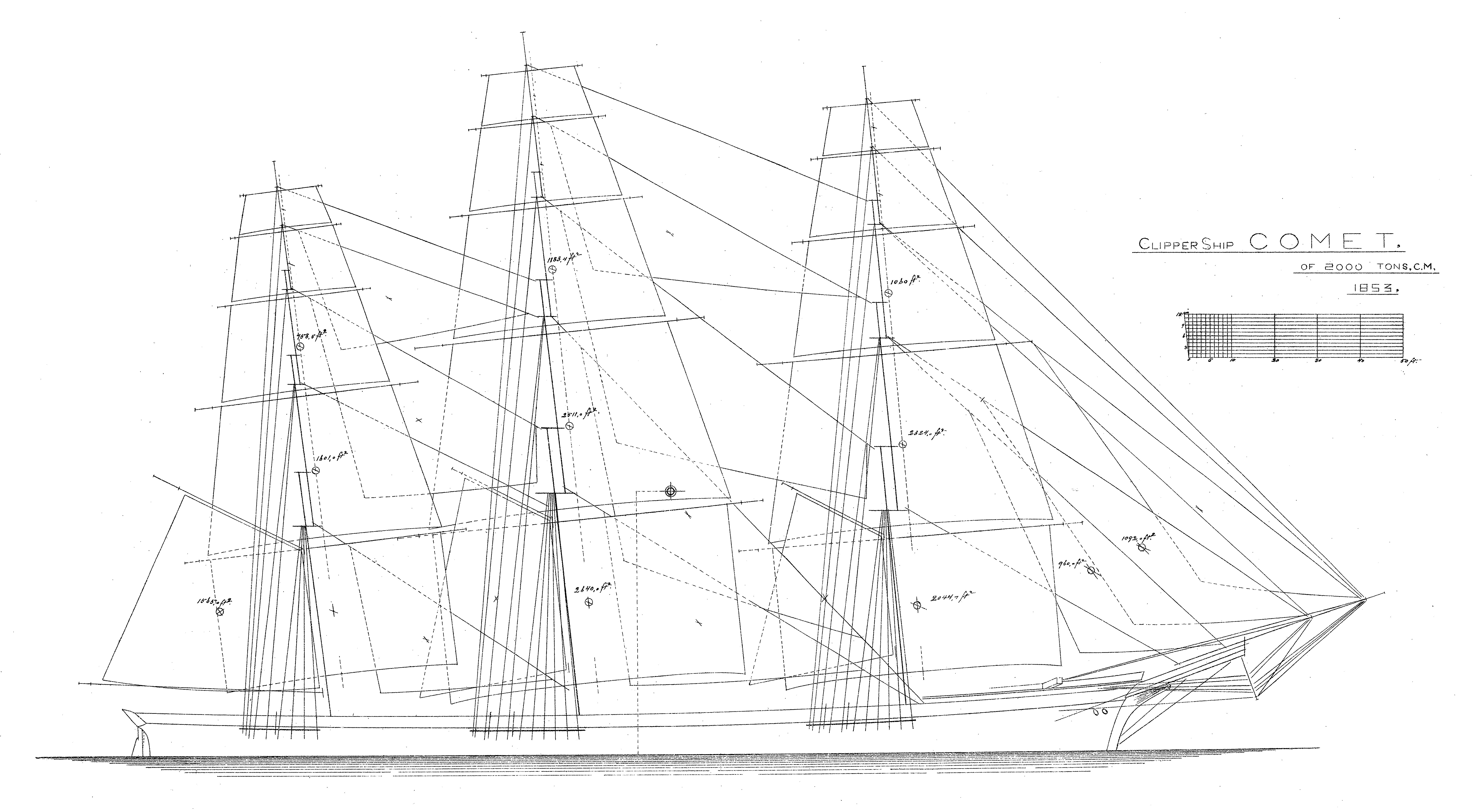
Full-rigged clipper ship, Comet, 1851

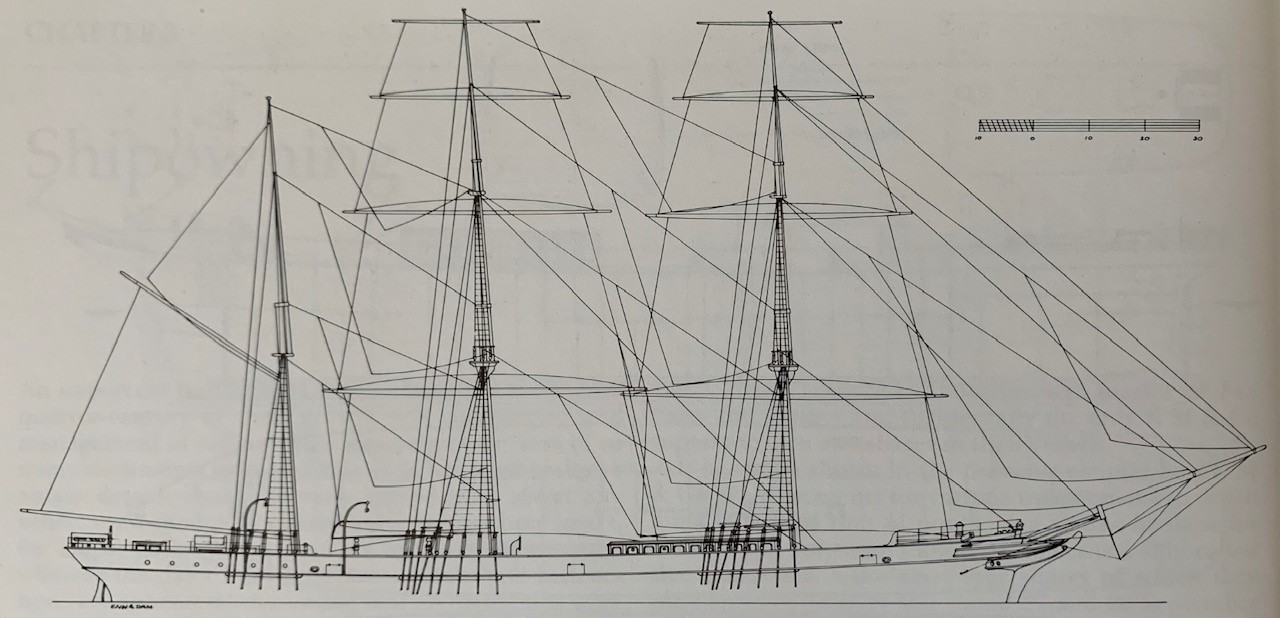
Barque, Fusi Yama, 1865

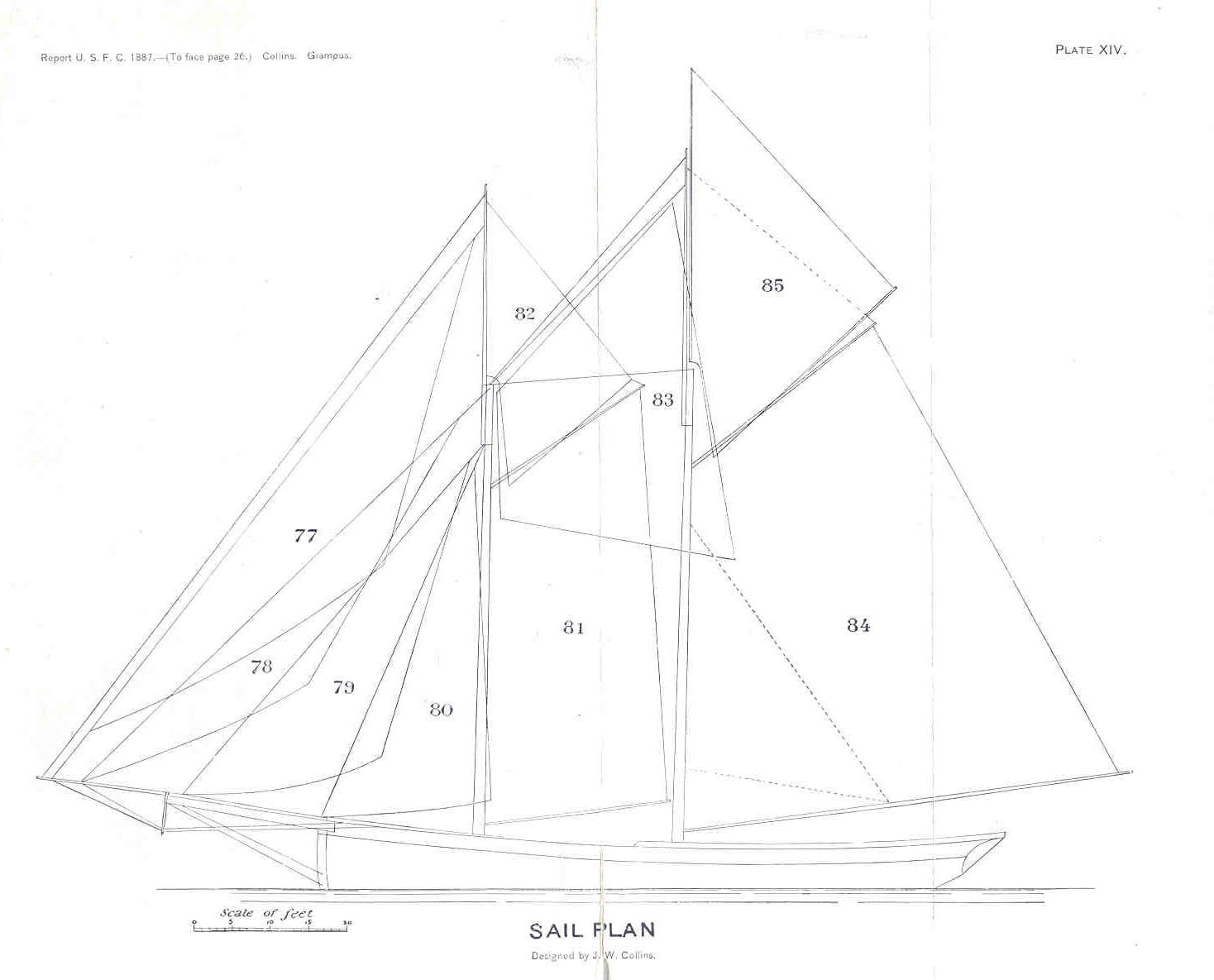
Schooner, Grampus, 1887
Racing sailing craft

Sailboard

Byte dinghy

470 dinghy

Flying Dutchman dinghy

E Scow

49er dinghy

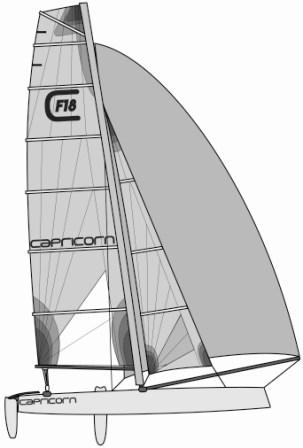
Formula 18 catamaran

J Class yacht

== See also ==
- Sailing rigs
