= Royal (sail) =

Type of sail for rigged sailing ships

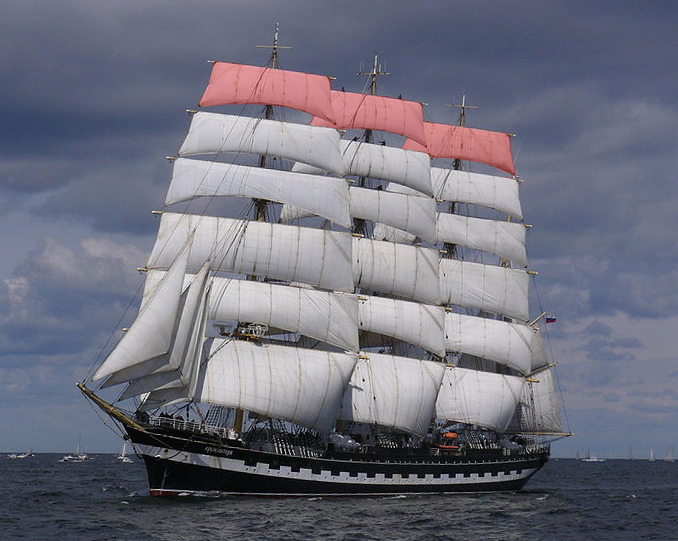
Illustration of the sailing ship Kruzenshtern. The royal sail is the top tier sail, shown highlighted.

A royal is a small sail flown immediately above the topgallant on square rigged sailing ships. It was originally called the "topgallant royal" and was used in light and favorable winds.

Royal sails were normally found only on larger ships with masts tall enough to accommodate the extra canvas. Royals were introduced around the turn of the 18th century but were not usually flown on the mizzenmast until the end of that century. It gave its name to a Dutch term for a light breeze—the Royal Sail Breeze or bovenbramzeilskoelte was a Force 2 wind on the Beaufort Scale.
