= Sailing =

Propulsion of a vehicle by wind power

Sailing craft and their rigs

Sloops racing with fore-and-aft sails

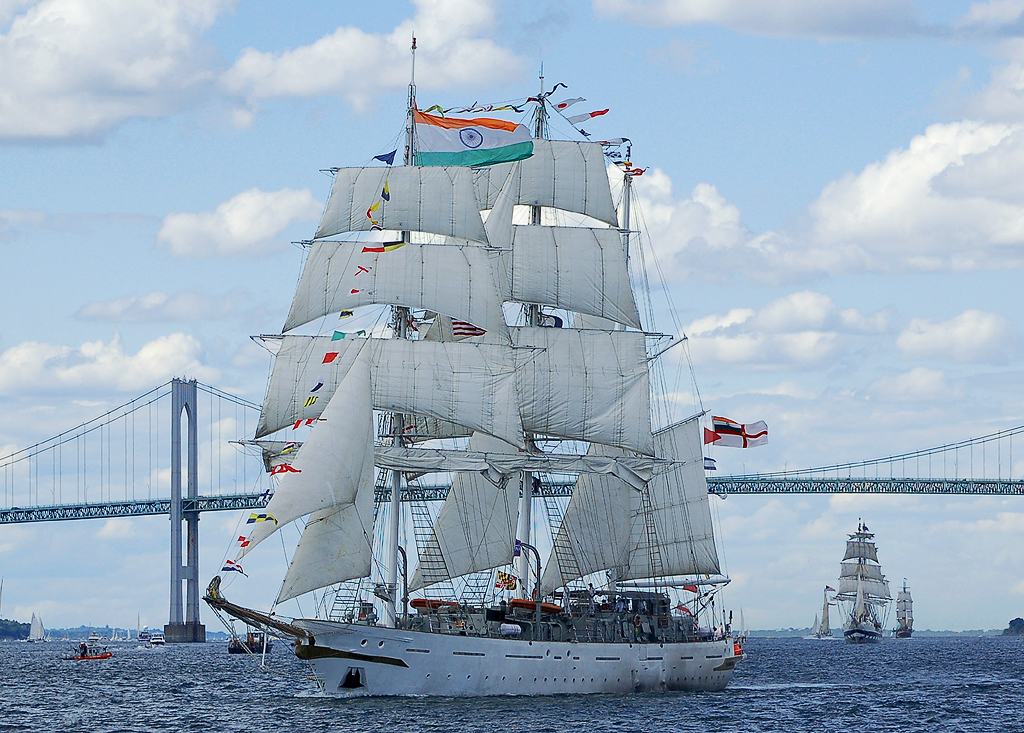
Three-masted barque with square sails

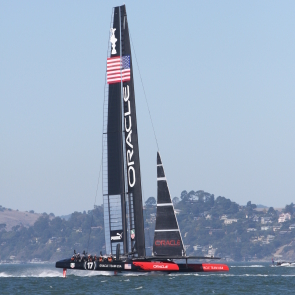
Sailing hydrofoil catamaran with wingsail

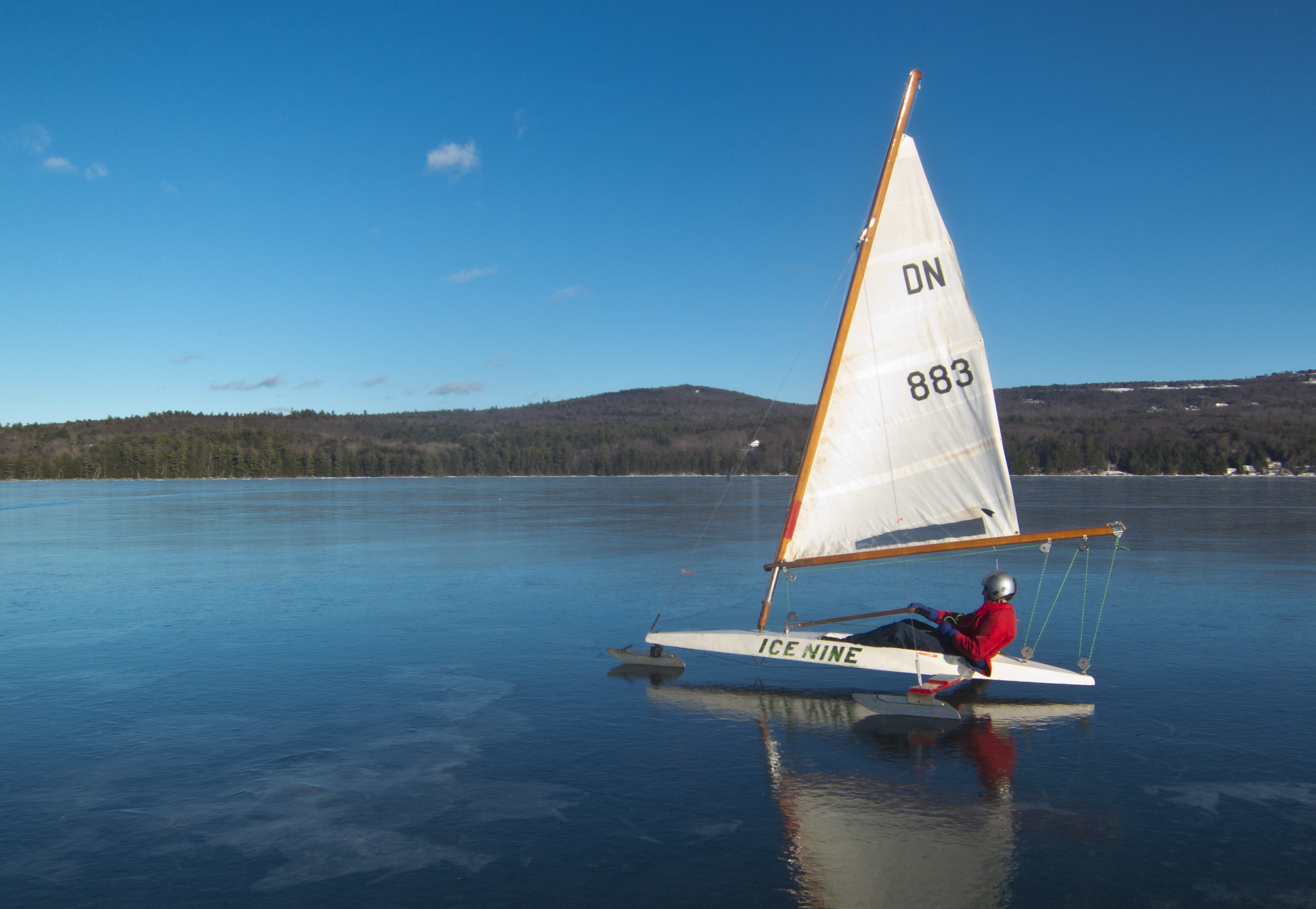
DN class ice boat

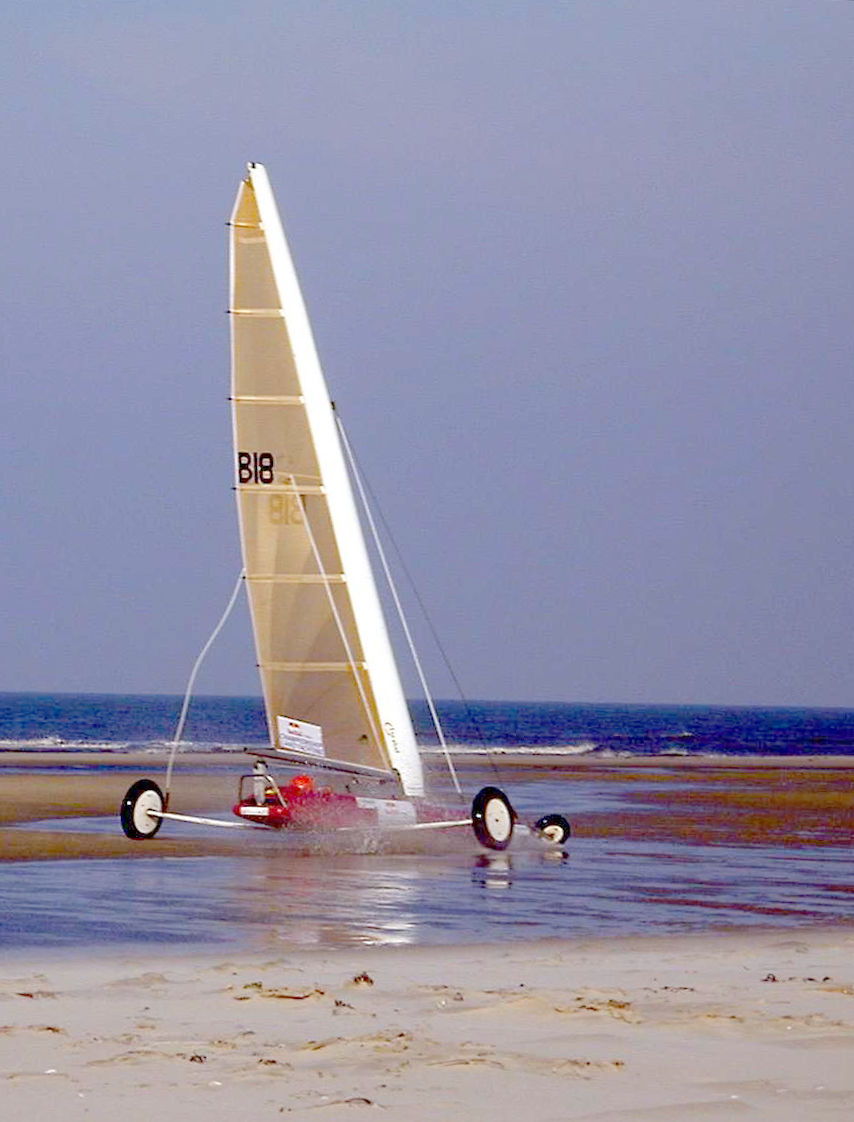
Class 3 competition land yacht

Sailing employs the wind—acting on sails, wing sails or kites—to propel a craft on the surface of the water (sailing ship, sailboat, raft, windsurfer, or kitesurfer), on ice (iceboat) or on land (land yacht) over a chosen course, which is often part of a larger plan of navigation.

From prehistory until the second half of the 19th century, sailing craft were the primary means of maritime trade and transportation; exploration across the seas and oceans was reliant on sail for anything other than the shortest distances. Naval power in this period relied on sail to varying degrees, depending on the available technology, culminating in the gun-armed sailing warships of the Age of Sail. Sail was slowly replaced by steam as the method of propulsion for ships over the latter part of the 19th century, as steam technology gradually improved through many developmental steps. (Note: Steam power required many engineering problems to be solved to achieve the full level of efficiency that was obtained by, say, the beginning of the 20th century. To pick a few: screw propulsion (replacing paddle wheels) needed an effective stern gland and thrust bearing; more efficient compound engines, running off higher boiler pressures required the solution of both engineering and regulatory problems; even more fuel-efficient triple expansion engines relied on previously unobtainable boiler pressures (needing better quality steel for the boilers and effective boiler design); all of which needed to be housed in sufficiently light but rigid hulls – this involved experimentation with composite construction and iron, and later steel hulls; the latter two needed effective anti-fouling paint as iron hulls could not be covered by the copper sheets used on wooden hulls due to galvanic corrosion.) Steam allowed scheduled services that ran at higher average speeds than sailing vessels. Large improvements in fuel economy allowed steam to progressively outcompete sail, ultimately in all commercial situations, giving ship-owning investors a better return on capital.

In the 21st century, most sailing represents a form of recreation or sport. Recreational sailing or yachting can be divided into racing and cruising. Cruising can include extended offshore and ocean-crossing trips, coastal sailing within sight of land, and daysailing.

Sailing relies on the physics of sails as they derive power from the wind, generating both lift and drag. On a given course, the sails are set to an angle that optimizes the development of wind power, as determined by the apparent wind, which is the wind as sensed from a moving vessel. The forces transmitted via the sails are resisted by forces from the hull, keel, and rudder of a sailing craft, by forces from skate runners of an iceboat, or by forces from wheels of a land sailing craft which are steering the course. This combination of forces means it is possible to sail both upwind and downwind courses. The course with respect to the true wind direction (as would be indicated by a stationary flag) is called a point of sail. Conventional sailing craft cannot derive wind power on a course with a point of sail that is too close into the wind.

== History ==
Sailing was probably independently invented in at least two regions: Island Southeast Asia and the Mediterranean (including the Nile and other Middle Eastern rivers). The Caribbean, which meets the criteria for a "nursery" region for maritime experimentation, with warm waters and mutually visible islands, did not develop sailing technology but adopted it after the arrival of European explorers. The geography of the Nile, with a northward-flowing current and the prevailing wind blowing in the opposite direction, was conducive to early use of sail. The same wind-and-current combination on the Guayaquil River in Ecuador, together with the otherwise unexplained origin of the region's sailing craft, may provide a third site of independent invention.

Throughout history, sailing was a key means of propulsion that gave greater mobility than overland travel. This greater mobility increased the capacity for exploration, trade, transport, warfare, and fishing, especially compared with overland options.

Until the significant improvements in land transportation during the 19th century, if water transport was an option, it was faster, cheaper, and safer than making the same journey by land. This applied equally to sea crossings, coastal voyages, and river and lake travel. Examples of this include the large grain trade in the Mediterranean during the classical period. Cities such as Rome were totally reliant on sailing ships to deliver the large amounts of grain needed. It has been estimated that it cost less for a sailing ship of the Roman Empire to carry grain the length of the Mediterranean than to move the same amount 15 miles by road. Rome consumed about 150,000 tons of Egyptian grain each year over the first three centuries AD. (Note: The distance by sea from Alexandria (the main Egyptian grain port during the Roman Empire) to Civitavecchia (the modern port for Rome) is 1,126 nautical miles (2,085 km; 1,296 mi).)

A similar but more recent trade in coal was from mines situated close to the River Tyne to London. Beginning in the 14th century at the latest, it grew as the city's population increased. In 1795, 4,395 cargoes of coal were delivered to London. This would have needed a fleet of about 500 sailing colliers (making 8 or 9 trips a year). This quantity had doubled by 1839. (The first steam-powered collier was not launched until 1852, and sailing colliers continued working into the 20th century.) (Note: The distance by sea from the Tyne to London is 315 nautical miles (583 km; 362 mi).)

=== Exploration and Research ===
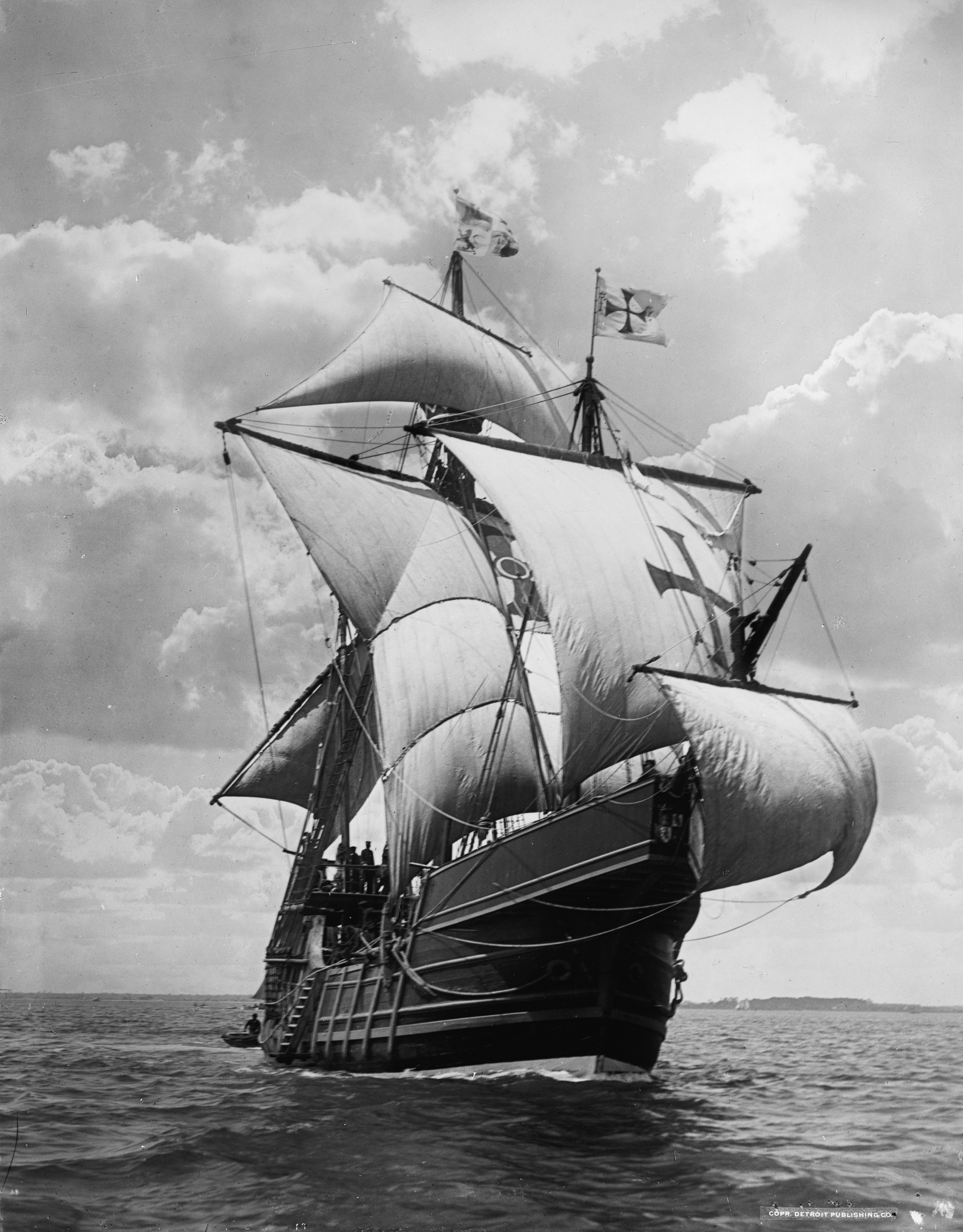
Replica of Christopher Columbus's carrack, Santa María under sail

The earliest image suggesting the use of sail on a boat may be on a piece of pottery from Mesopotamia, dated to the 6th millennium BCE. The image is thought to show a bipod mast mounted on the hull of a reed boat – no sail is depicted. The earliest representation of a sail, from Egypt, is dated to circa 3100 BCE. The Nile is considered a suitable place for early use of sail for propulsion. This is because the river's current flows from south to north, whilst the prevailing wind direction is north to south. Therefore, a boat of that time could use the current to go north – an unobstructed trip of 750 miles – and sail to make the return trip. Evidence of early sailors has also been found in other locations, such as Kuwait, Turkey, Syria, Minoa, Bahrain, and India, among others.

Austronesian peoples used sails from some time before 2000 BCE. Their expansion from what is now Southern China and Taiwan started in 3000 BCE. Their technology came to include outriggers, catamarans, and crab claw sails, which enabled the Austronesian Expansion at around 3000 to 1500 BCE into the islands of Maritime Southeast Asia, and thence to Micronesia, Island Melanesia, Polynesia, and Madagascar. Since there is no commonality between the boat technology of China and that of the Austronesians, these distinctive characteristics must have developed at or sometime after the beginning of the expansion. They traveled vast distances of open ocean in outrigger canoes using navigation methods such as stick charts. The windward sailing capability of Austronesian boats allowed a strategy of sailing to windward on a voyage of exploration, with a return downwind either to report a discovery or if no land was found. This was well-suited to the prevailing winds as the Pacific islands were steadily colonized.

By the time of the Age of Discovery—starting in the 15th century—square-rigged, multi-masted vessels were the norm. They were guided by navigation techniques that included the magnetic compass and sightings of the sun and stars, enabling them to undertake transoceanic voyages.

During the Age of Discovery, sailing ships figured in European voyages around Africa to China and Japan, and across the Atlantic Ocean to North and South America. Later, sailing ships ventured into the Arctic to explore northern sea routes and assess natural resources. In the 18th and 19th centuries, sailing vessels made Hydrographic surveys to develop charts for navigation and, at times, carried scientists aboard, as with the voyages of James Cook and the Second voyage of HMS Beagle with naturalist Charles Darwin.

=== Commerce ===
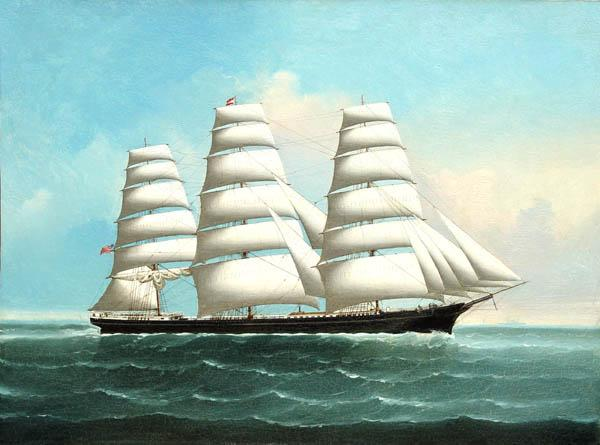
A late-19th-century American clipper ship

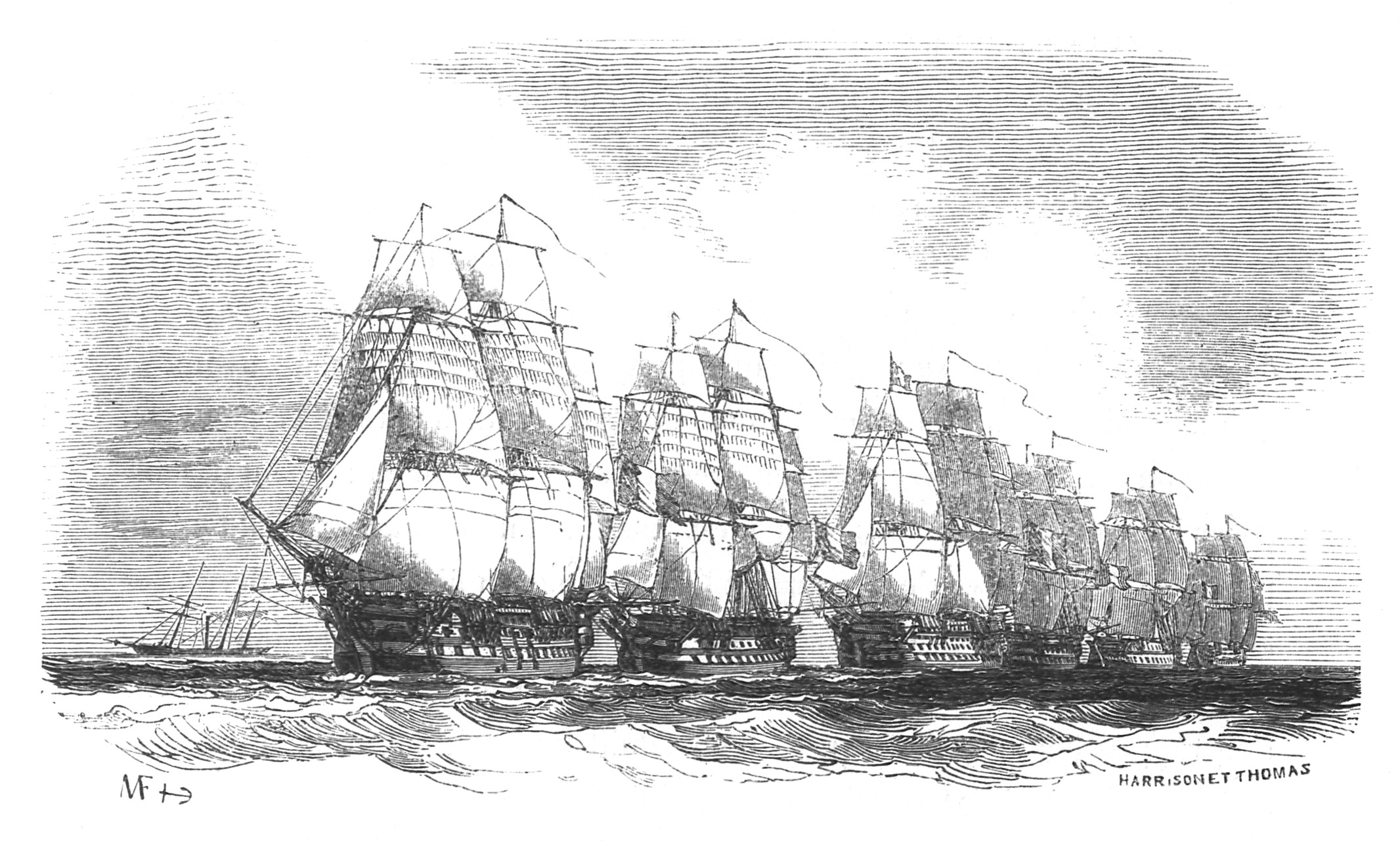
A French squadron forming a line of battle circa 1840.

In the early 1800s, fast blockade-running schooners and brigantines—Baltimore Clippers—evolved into three-masted, typically ship-rigged sailing vessels with fine lines that enhanced speed, but lessened capacity for high-value cargo, like tea from China. Masts were as high as 100 feet (30 m) and were able to achieve speeds of 19 knots (35 km/h), allowing for passages of up to 465 nautical miles (861 km) per 24 hours. Clippers yielded to bulkier, slower vessels, which became economically competitive in the mid-19th century. Sail plans with just fore-and-aft sails (schooners), or a mixture of the two (brigantines, barques and barquentines) emerged. Coastal top-sail schooners with a crew as small as two managing the sail handling became an efficient way to carry bulk cargo, since only the fore-sails required tending while tacking and steam-driven machinery was often available for raising the sails and the anchor.

Iron-hulled sailing ships represented the final evolution of sailing ships at the end of the Age of Sail. They were built to carry bulk cargo for long distances in the nineteenth and early twentieth centuries. They were the largest of merchant sailing ships, with three to five masts and square sails, as well as other sail plans. They carried bulk cargoes between continents. Iron-hulled sailing ships were mainly built from the 1870s to 1900, when steamships began to outpace them economically because of their ability to keep a schedule regardless of the wind. Steel hulls also replaced iron hulls at around the same time. Even into the twentieth century, sailing ships could hold their own on transoceanic voyages such as Australia to Europe, since they did not require bunkerage for coal nor fresh water for steam, and they were faster than the early steamers, which usually could barely make 8 knots (15 km/h). Ultimately, the steamships' independence from the wind and their ability to take shorter routes, passing through the Suez and Panama Canals, made sailing ships uneconomical.

=== Naval power ===
Until the general adoption of carvel-built ships that relied on an internal skeleton structure to bear the weight of the ship and for gun ports to be cut in the side, sailing ships were just vehicles for delivering fighters to the enemy for engagement. Early Phoenician, Greek, Roman galleys would ram each other, then pour onto the decks of the opposing force and continue the fight by hand, meaning that these galleys required speed and maneuverability. This need for speed translated into longer ships with multiple rows of oars along the sides, known as biremes and triremes. Typically, the sailing ships during this time period were the merchant ships.

By 1500, Gun ports allowed sailing vessels to sail alongside an enemy vessel and fire a broadside of multiple cannon. This development allowed for naval fleets to array themselves into a line of battle, whereby, warships would maintain their place in the line to engage the enemy in a parallel or perpendicular line.

== Modern applications ==
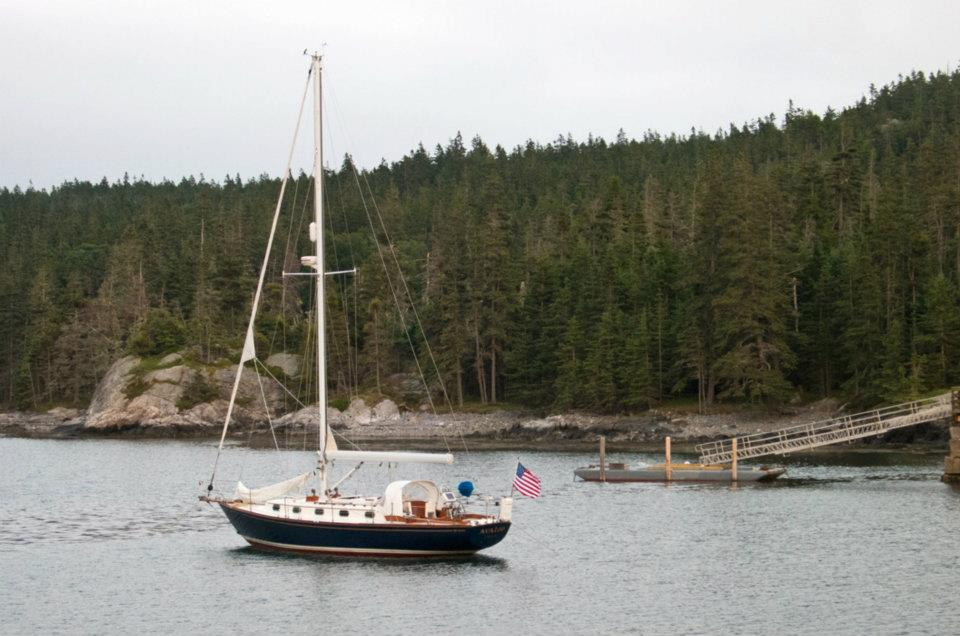
Cruising sailing yacht at anchor in Duck Harbor on Isle au Haut, Maine

Comanche leaving Newport, Rhode Island for Plymouth, England in the 2015 Rolex Transatlantic Race

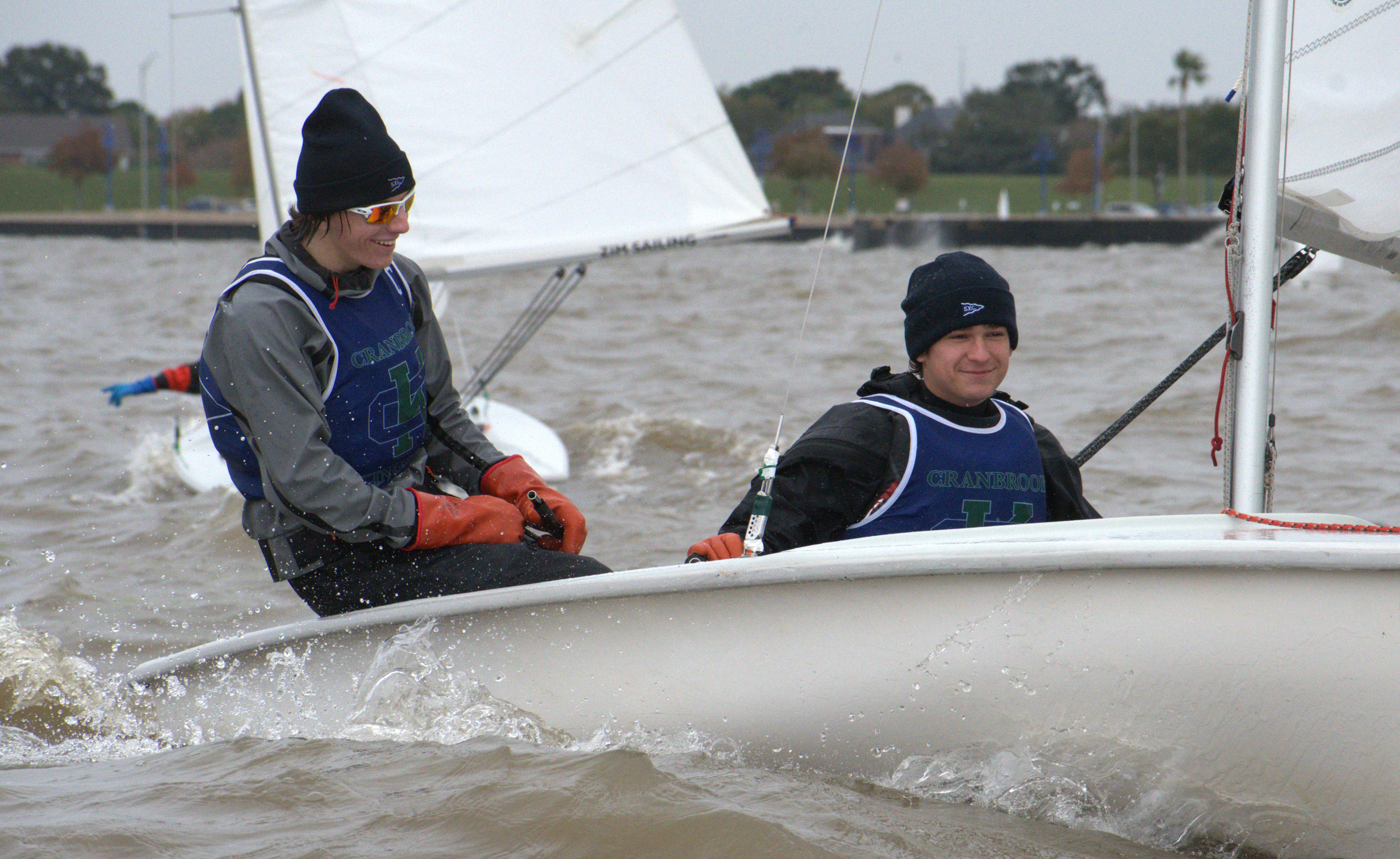
Cranbrook Kingswood High School sailing team competing in the 2022 SugarBowl fleet race regatta on 20 November 2022

While the use of sailing vessels for commerce or naval power has been supplanted by engine-driven vessels, there are still commercial operations that offer sailing cruises. Modern navies also employ sailing vessels to train cadets in seamanship. Recreation or sport accounts for the bulk of sailing in modern boats.

=== Recreation ===
Recreational sailing can be divided into two categories: day-sailing, where one gets off the boat for the night, and cruising, where one stays aboard.

Day-sailing primarily affords the pleasure of experiencing the pleasure of sailing a boat. No destination is required. It is an opportunity to share the experience with others. A variety of boats with no overnight accommodations, ranging in size from 10 feet (3.0 m) to over 30 feet (9.1 m), may be regarded as day sailors.

Cruising on a sailing yacht may be either near-shore or passage-making out of sight of land and entails the use of sailboats that support sustained overnight use. Coastal cruising grounds include areas of the Mediterranean and Black Seas, Northern Europe, Western Europe and islands of the North Atlantic, West Africa and the islands of the South Atlantic, the Caribbean, and regions of North and Central America. Passage-making under sail occurs on routes through oceans all over the world. Circular routes exist between the Americas and Europe, and between South Africa and South America. There are many routes from the Americas, Australia, New Zealand, and Asia to island destinations in the South Pacific. Some cruisers circumnavigate the globe.

=== Sport ===
Sailing as a sport is organized on a hierarchical basis, starting at the yacht club level and reaching up into national and international federations; it may entail racing yachts, sailing dinghies, or other small, open sailing craft, including iceboats and land yachts. Sailboat racing is governed by World Sailing with most racing formats using the Racing Rules of Sailing. It entails a variety of different disciplines, including:

- Oceanic racing, held over long distances and in open water, often last multiple days and include world circumnavigation, such as the Vendée Globe and The Ocean Race.
- Fleet racing, featuring multiple boats in a regatta that comprises multiple races or heats.
- Match racing comprises two boats competing against each other, as is done with the America's Cup, vying to cross a finish line first.
- Team racing between two teams of three boats each in a format analogous to match racing.
- Speed sailing to set new records for different categories of craft with oversight by the World Sailing Speed Record Council.
- Sail boarding has a variety of disciplines particular to that sport.

== Navigation ==
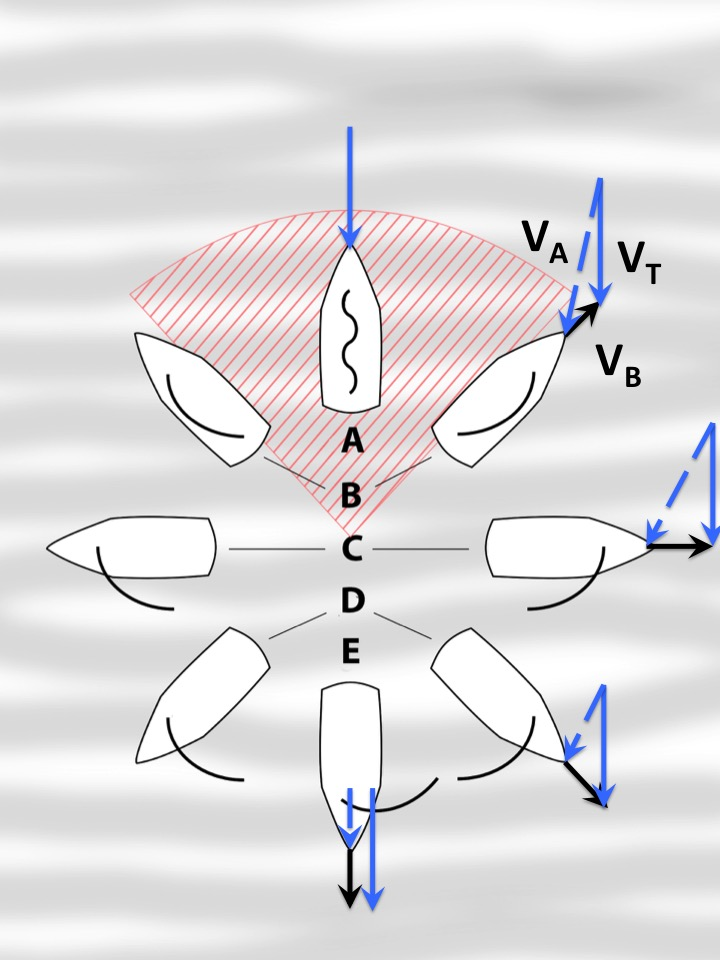
Points of sail (and predominant sail force component for a displacement sailboat). A. Luffing (no propulsive force) — 0-30° B. Close-hauled (lift)— 30–50° C. Beam reach (lift)— 90° D. Broad reach (lift–drag)— ~135° E. Running (drag)— 180° True wind (V_{T}) is the same everywhere in the diagram, whereas boat velocity (V_{B}) and apparent wind (V_{A}) vary with point of sail.

=== Point of sail ===
A sailing craft's ability to derive power from the wind depends on the point of sail it is on—the direction of travel under sail in relation to the true wind direction over the surface. The principal points of sail roughly correspond to 45° segments of a circle, starting with 0° directly into the wind. For many sailing craft, the arc spanning 45° on either side of the wind is a "no-go" zone, where a sail is unable to mobilize power from the wind. Sailing on a course as close to the wind as possible—approximately 45°—is termed "close-hauled". At 90° off the wind, a craft is on a "beam reach". At 135° off the wind, a craft is on a "broad reach". At 180° off the wind (sailing in the same direction as the wind), a craft is "running downwind".

In points of sail that range from close-hauled to a broad reach, sails act substantially like a wing, with lift predominantly propelling the craft. In points of sail from a broad reach to downwind, sails act substantially like a parachute, with drag predominantly propelling the craft. For craft with little forward resistance, such as ice boats and land yachts, this transition occurs further off the wind than for sailboats and sailing ships.

Wind direction for points of sail always refers to the true wind—the wind felt by a stationary observer. The apparent wind—the wind felt by an observer on a moving sailing craft—determines the motive power for sailing craft.

A sailboat on three points of sail

The waves indicate the true wind direction. The flag indicates the apparent wind direction.

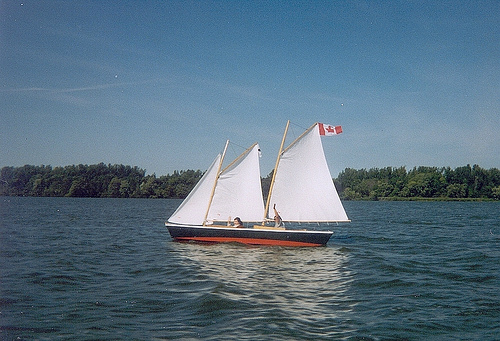
Close-hauled: the flag is streaming backwards, the sails are sheeted in tightly.

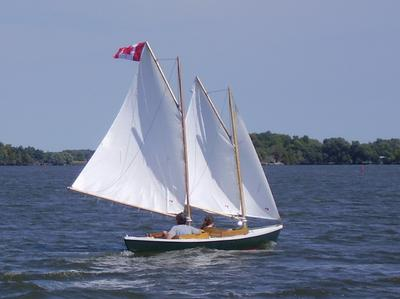
Reaching: the flag is streaming slightly to the side as the sails are sheeted to align with the apparent wind.

Running: the wind is coming from behind the vessel; the sails are "wing on wing" to be at right angles to the apparent wind.

==== Effect on apparent wind ====
True wind velocity (V_{T}) combines with the sailing craft's velocity (V_{B}) to give the apparent wind velocity (V_{A}), the air velocity experienced by instrumentation or crew on a moving sailing craft. Apparent wind velocity provides the motive power for the sails on any given point of sail. It varies from being the true wind velocity of a stopped craft in irons in the no-go zone, to being faster than the true wind speed as the sailing craft's velocity adds to the true wind speed on a reach. It diminishes towards zero for a craft sailing dead downwind.

Effect of apparent wind on sailing craft at three points of sail

Sailing craft A is close-hauled. Sailing craft B is on a beam reach. Sailing craft C is on a broad reach.
Boat velocity (in black) generates an equal and opposite apparent wind component (not shown), which combines with the true wind to become apparent wind.

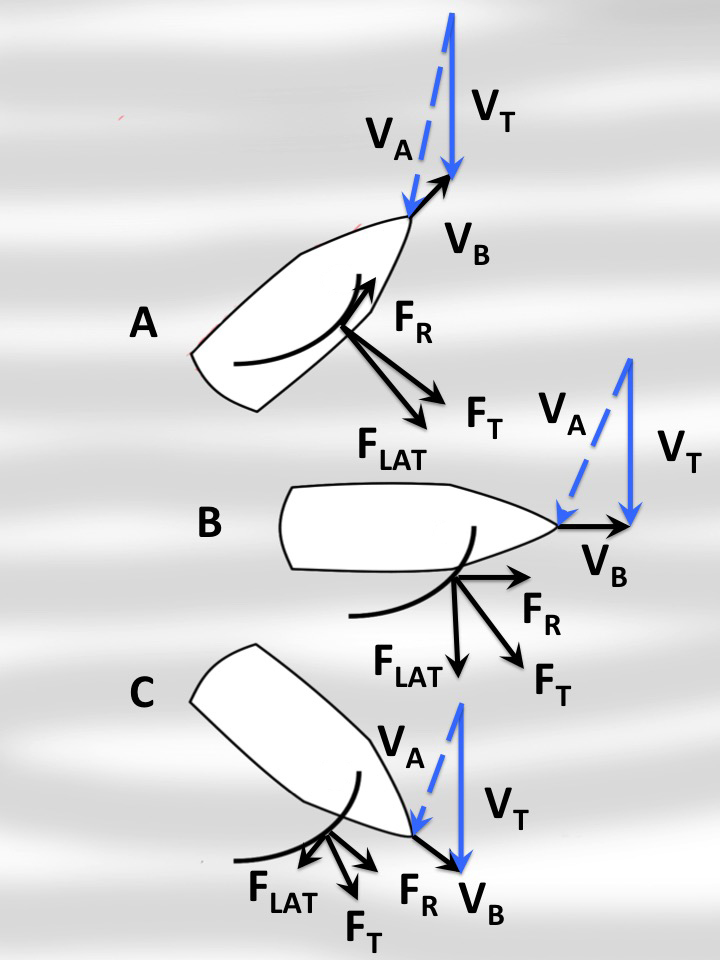
Apparent wind and forces on a sailboat.
As the boat sails further from the wind, the apparent wind becomes smaller, and the lateral component becomes less; boat speed is highest on the beam reach.

Apparent wind on an iceboat.
As the iceboat sails further from the wind, the apparent wind increases slightly, and the boat speed is highest on the broad reach. The sail is sheeted in for all three points of sail.

The speed of sailboats through the water is limited by the resistance that results from hull drag in the water. Ice boats typically have the least resistance to forward motion of any sailing craft. Consequently, a sailboat experiences a wider range of apparent wind angles than does an ice boat, whose speed is typically great enough to have the apparent wind coming from a few degrees to one side of its course, necessitating sailing with the sail sheeted in for most points of sail. On conventional sailboats, the sails are set to create lift for those points of sail where it's possible to align the leading edge of the sail with the apparent wind.

For a sailboat, the point of sail affects the lateral force significantly. The higher the boat points to the wind under sail, the stronger the lateral force, which requires resistance from a keel or other underwater foils, including daggerboard, centerboard, skeg, and rudder. Lateral force also induces heeling in a sailboat, which is resisted by the weight of ballast from the crew or the boat itself, and by the boat's shape, especially on a catamaran. As the boat points off the wind, lateral force and the forces required to resist it become less important. On ice boats, lateral forces are countered by the lateral resistance of the blades on the ice and by their spacing, which generally prevents heeling.

=== Course under sail ===
Atmospheric circulation, showing wind direction at various latitudes

Wind circulation around an occluded front in the Northern Hemisphere

Wind and currents are important factors to plan for both offshore and inshore sailing. Predicting the wind's availability, strength, and direction is key to harnessing its power along the desired course. Ocean currents, tides, and river currents may deflect a sailing vessel from its desired course.

If the desired course is within the no-go zone, then the sailing craft must follow a zig-zag route into the wind to reach its waypoint or destination. Downwind, certain high-performance sailing craft can reach the destination more quickly by following a zig-zag route on a series of broad reaches.

Negotiating obstructions or a channel may also require a change of direction relative to the wind, necessitating a change of tack with the wind on the opposite side of the craft.

Changing tack is called tacking when the wind crosses over the bow of the craft as it turns and jibing (or gybing) if the wind passes over the stern.

==== Upwind ====
A sailing craft can sail on a course anywhere outside of its no-go zone. If the next waypoint or destination is within the arc defined by the no-go zone from the craft's current position, then it must perform a series of tacking maneuvers to get there on a zigzag route, called beating to windward. The progress along that route is called the course made good; the speed between the starting and ending points of the route is called the speed made good and is calculated by the distance between the two points, divided by the travel time. The limiting line to the waypoint that allows the sailing vessel to leave it to leeward is called the layline. Whereas some Bermuda-rigged sailing yachts can sail as close as 30° to the wind, most 20th-Century square riggers are limited to 60° off the wind. Fore-and-aft rigs are designed to operate with the wind on either side, whereas square rigs and kites are designed to have the wind come from one side of the sail only.

Because the lateral wind forces are highest when sailing close-hauled, the resisting water forces around the vessel's keel, centerboard, rudder, and other foils must also be highest to limit sideways motion or leeway. Ice boats and land yachts minimize lateral motion by using the resistance of their blades or wheels.

===== Changing tack by tacking =====
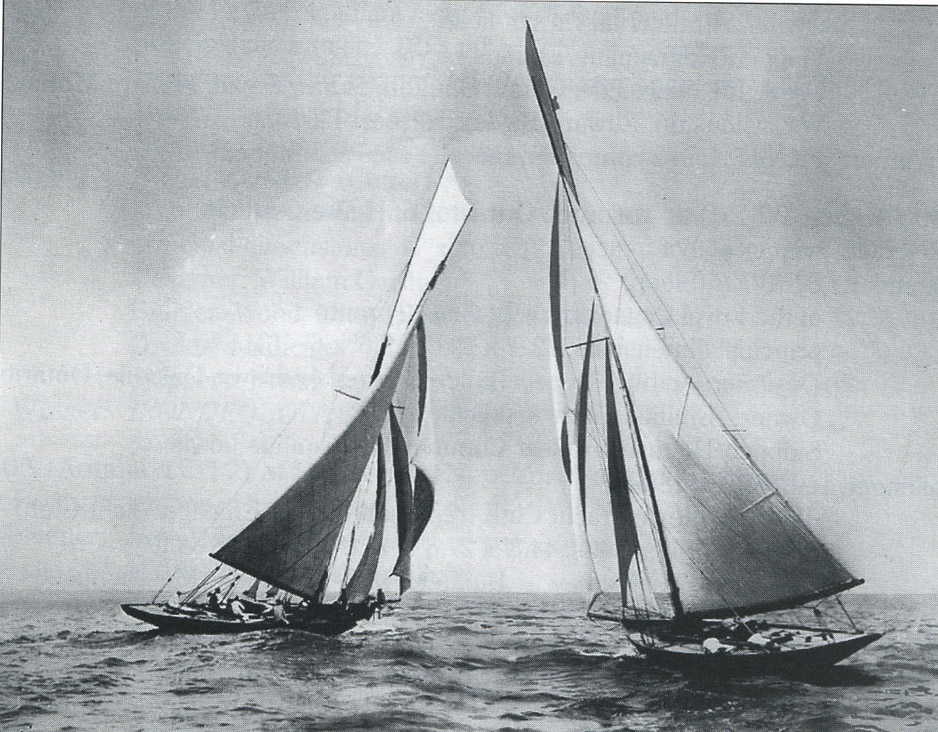
Two sailing yachts on opposite tacks

Tacking or coming about is a maneuver by which a sailing craft turns its bow into and through the wind (referred to as "the eye of the wind") so that the apparent wind changes from one side to the other, allowing progress on the opposite tack. The type of sailing rig dictates the procedures and constraints on achieving a tacking maneuver. Fore-and-aft rigs allow their sails to hang limp as they tack; square rigs must present the full frontal area of the sail to the wind, when changing from side to side; and windsurfers have flexibly pivoting and fully rotating masts that get flipped from side to side.

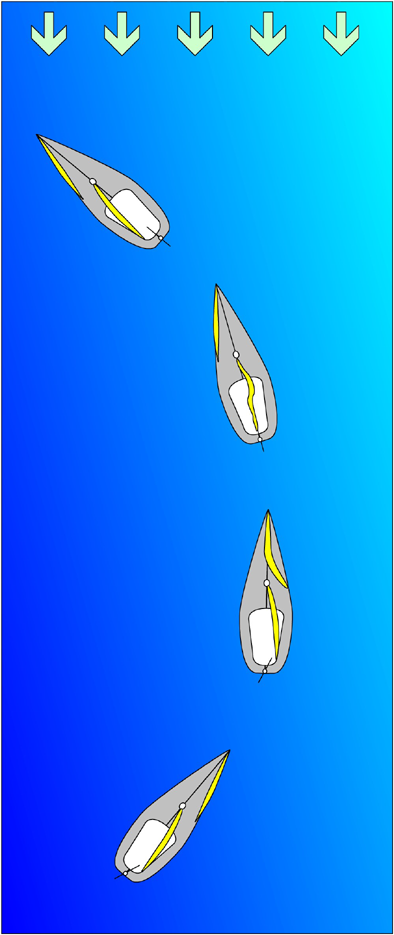
Tacking from the port tack (bottom) to the starboard (top) tack

Beating to windward on short (P1), medium (P2), and long (P3) tacks

==== Downwind ====
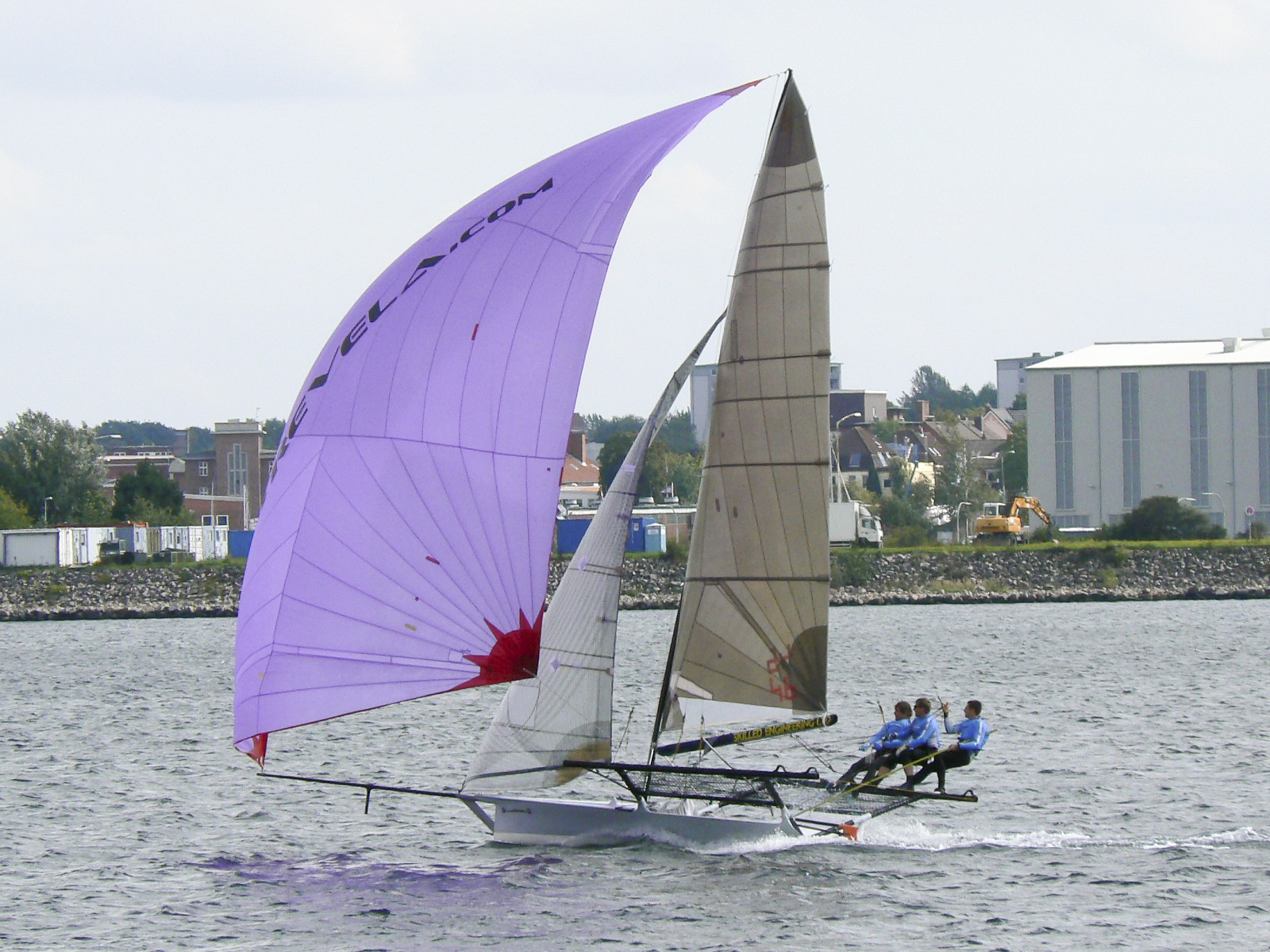
18ft Skiff, flying a sprit-mounted asymmetrical spinnaker on a broad reach

A sailing craft can travel directly downwind only at a speed that is less than the wind speed. However, some sailing craft such as iceboats, sand yachts, and some high-performance sailboats can achieve a higher downwind velocity made good by traveling on a series of broad reaches, punctuated by jibes in between. It was explored by sailing vessels starting in 1975 and now extends to high-performance skiffs, catamarans, and foiling sailboats.

Navigating a channel or downwind course among obstructions may necessitate changes in direction that require a change of tack, accomplished by jibing.

===== Changing tack by jibing =====
Jibing or gybing is a sailing maneuver by which a sailing craft turns its stern past the eye of the wind so that the apparent wind changes from one side to the other, allowing progress on the opposite tack. (When this is done when beating to windward, it is usually referred to as wearing.) This maneuver can be done on smaller boats by pulling the tiller towards yourself (the opposite side of the sail). As with tacking, the type of sailing rig dictates the procedures and constraints for jibing. Most fore-and-aft sails with booms, gaffs or sprits are unstable when the free end points into the eye of the wind and must be controlled to avoid a violent change to the other side. Lateen sails are often tacked by wearing, with the sheet being freed so that the sail rotates around the mast (avoiding the "bad tack"). Square rigs, as they present the full area of the sail to the wind from the rear, experience little change of operation when gybing, and may sometimes choose to wear rather than tack to avoid the risk of getting caught in stays. Windsurfers again have flexibly pivoting and fully rotating masts that get flipped from side to side.

=== Wind and currents ===
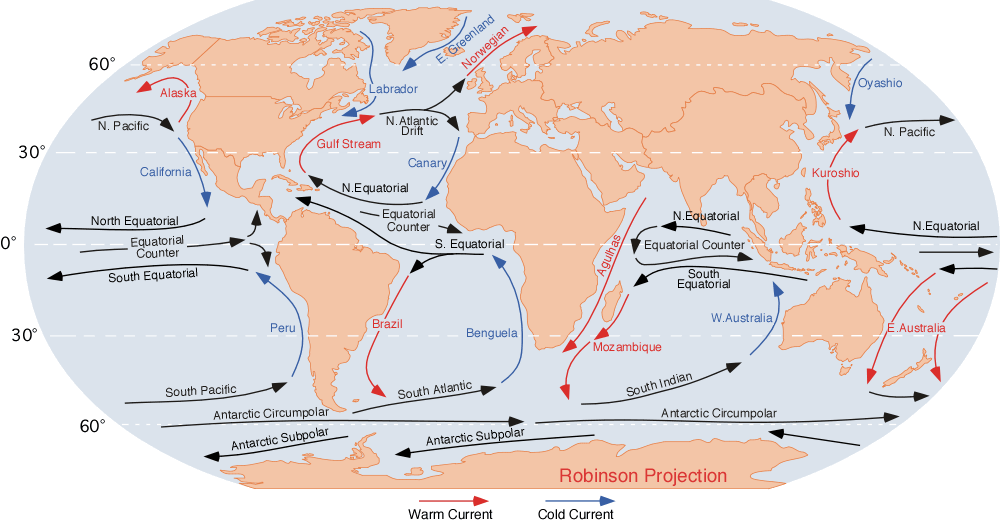
The ocean currents

Winds and oceanic currents are both the result of the sun powering their respective fluid media. Wind powers the sailing craft, and the ocean bears the craft on its course, as currents may alter the course of a sailing vessel on the ocean or a river.

- Wind – On a global scale, vessels making long voyages must take atmospheric circulation into account, which causes zones of westerlies, easterlies, trade winds, and high-pressure zones with light winds, sometimes called horse latitudes, in between. Sailors predict wind direction and strength with knowledge of high- and low-pressure areas, and the weather fronts that accompany them. Along coastal areas, sailors contend with diurnal changes in wind direction—flowing off the shore at night and onto the shore during the day. Local temporary wind shifts are called lifts, when they improve the sailing craft's ability to travel along its rhumb line in the direction of the next waypoint. Unfavorable wind shifts are called headers.
- Currents – On a global scale, vessels making long voyages must take major ocean current circulation into account. Major oceanic currents, like the Gulf Stream in the Atlantic Ocean and the Kuroshio Current in the Pacific Ocean require planning for the effect that they will have on a transiting vessel's track. Likewise, tides affect a vessel's track, especially in areas with large tidal ranges, like the Bay of Fundy or along Southeast Alaska, or where the tide flows through straits, like Deception Pass in Puget Sound. Mariners use tide and current tables to inform their navigation. Before the advent of motors, it was advantageous for sailing vessels to enter or leave port or to pass through a strait with the tide.

== Trimming ==
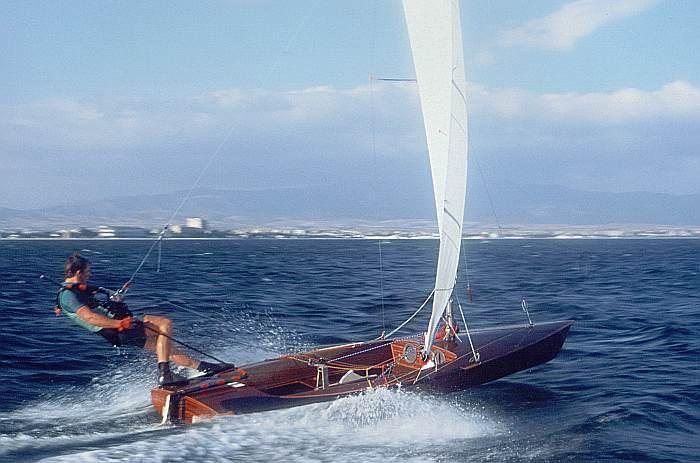
A Contender dinghy trimmed for a reach with the sail aligned with the apparent wind and the crew providing moveable ballast to promote planing

Trimming refers to adjusting the lines that control sails, including the sheets that control the angle of the sails with respect to the wind, the halyards that raise and tighten the sails, and the adjustments to the hull's resistance to heeling, yawing, or progress through the water.

=== Sails ===
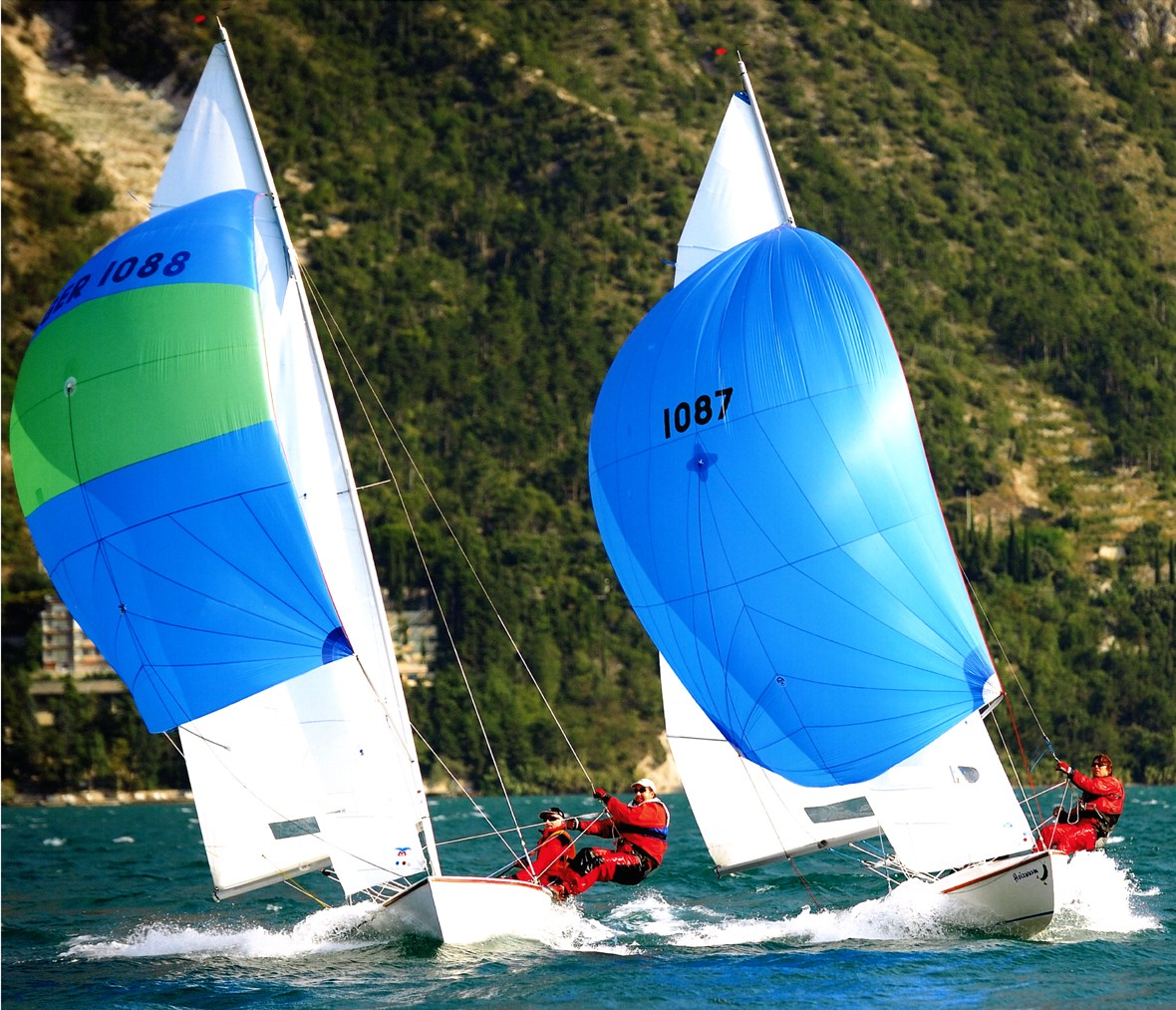
Spinnakers are adapted for sailing off the wind.

In their most developed version, square sails are controlled by two sheets, two braces, two clewlines, two reef tackles, and four buntlines, each of which may be controlled by a crew member as the sail is adjusted. Towards the end of the Age of Sail, steam-powered machinery reduced the number of crew required to trim sail.

Adjustment of the angle of a fore-and-aft sail with respect to the apparent wind is controlled with a line, called a "sheet". On points of sail between close-hauled and a broad reach, the goal is typically to create flow along the sail to maximize power through lift. Streamers placed on the surface of the sail, called tell-tales, indicate whether that flow is smooth or turbulent. Smooth flow on both sides indicates proper trim. A jib and mainsail are typically configured to be adjusted to create a smooth laminar flow, leading from one to the other in what is called the "slot effect".

On downwind points of sail, power is achieved primarily with the wind pushing on the sail, as indicated by drooping tell-tales. Spinnakers are light-weight, large-area, highly curved sails that are adapted to sailing off the wind.

In addition to using the sheets to adjust the angle with respect to the apparent wind, other lines control the shape of the sail, notably the outhaul, halyard, boom vang, and backstay. These control the curvature that is appropriate to the windspeed; the higher the wind, the flatter the sail. When the wind strength is greater than these adjustments can accommodate to prevent overpowering the sailing craft, sail area is reduced through reefing, substituting a smaller sail or by other means.

==== Reducing sail ====
Reducing sail on square-rigged ships could be accomplished by exposing less of each sail, by tying it off higher up with reefing points. Additionally, as winds get stronger, sails can be furled or removed from the spars entirely until the vessel is surviving hurricane-force winds under "bare poles".

On fore-and-aft rigged vessels, reducing sail may involve furling the jib and reefing or partially lowering the mainsail, that is, reducing the area of a sail without actually changing it for a smaller sail. This results both in a reduced sail area but also in a lower centre of effort from the sails, reducing the heeling moment and keeping the boat more upright.

There are three common methods of reefing the mainsail:

- Slab reefing, which involves lowering the sail by about one-quarter to one-third of its full length and tightening the lower part of the sail using an outhaul or a pre-loaded reef line through a cringle at the new clew, and hook through a cringle at the new tack.
- In-boom roller-reefing, with a horizontal foil inside the boom. This method allows for standard- or full-length horizontal battens.
- In-mast (or on-mast) roller-reefing. This method rolls the sail up around a vertical foil, either inside a slot in the mast or affixed to its outside. It requires a mainsail with either no battens or newly developed vertical battens.

=== Hull ===
Hull trim has three aspects, each tied to an axis of rotation, they are controlling:

- Heeling (rotation about the longitudinal axis – or leaning to either port or starboard)
- Helm force (rotation about the vertical axis)
- Hull drag (rotation about the horizontal axis amidships)

Each is a reaction to forces on sails and is achieved either by weight distribution or by management of the center of force of the underwater foils (keel, daggerboard, etc.), compared with the center of force on the sails.

==== Heeling ====
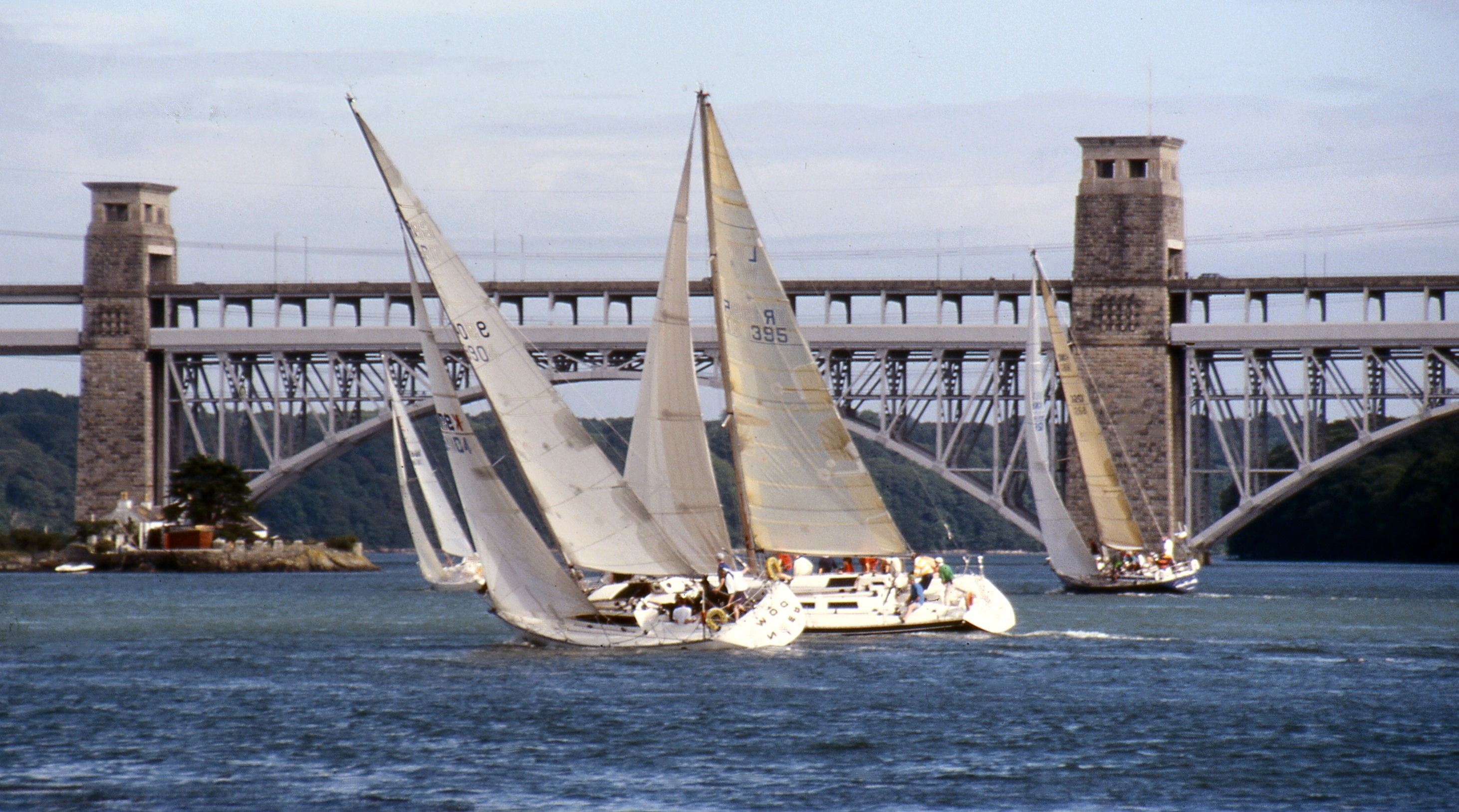
Boats heeling in front of Britannia Bridge in a round-Anglesey race, 1998

A sailing vessel heels when the boat leans over to the side in reaction to wind forces on the sails.

A sailing vessel's form stability (derived from the hull shape and the position of the center of gravity) is the starting point for resisting heeling. Catamarans and iceboats have a wide stance that makes them resistant to heeling. Additional measures for trimming a sailing craft to control heeling include:

- Ballast in the keel, which counteracts heeling as the boat rolls.
- Shifting of weight, which might be crew on a trapeze or moveable ballast across the boat.
- Reducing sail
- Adjusting the depth of underwater foils to control their lateral resistance force and center of resistance

==== Helm force ====
The alignment of the center of force of the sails with the center of resistance of the hull and its appendices controls whether the craft will track straight with little steering input, or whether correction needs to be made to hold it away from turning into the wind (a weather helm) or turning away from the wind (a lee helm). A center of force behind the center of resistance causes a weather helm. The center of force ahead of the center of resistance causes a lee helm. When the two are closely aligned, the helm is neutral and requires little input to maintain course.

==== Hull drag ====
Fore-and-aft weight distribution changes the cross-section of a vessel in the water. Small sailing craft are sensitive to crew placement. They are usually designed to have the crew stationed midships to minimize hull drag.

== Other aspects of seamanship ==
1 – mainsail 2 – staysail 3 – spinnaker 4 – hull 5 – keel 6 – rudder 7 – skeg 8 – mast 9 – spreader 10 – shroud 11 – sheet 12 – boom 13 - mast 14 – spinnaker pole 15 – backstay 16 – forestay 17 – boom vang

Seamanship encompasses all aspects of taking a sailing vessel in and out of port, navigating it to its destination, and securing it at anchor or alongside a dock. Important aspects of seamanship include using a common language aboard a sailing craft and managing the lines that control the sails and rigging.

=== Nautical terms ===
Nautical terms for elements of a vessel: starboard (right-hand side), port or larboard (left-hand side), forward or fore (frontward), aft or abaft (rearward), bow (forward part of the hull), stern (aft part of the hull), beam (the widest part). Spars, supporting sails, include masts, booms, yards, gaffs, and poles. Movable lines that control sails or other equipment are collectively known as a vessel's running rigging. Lines that raise sails are called halyards while those that strike them are called downhauls. Lines that adjust (trim) the sails are called sheets. These are often referred to by the name of the sail they control (such as main sheet or jib sheet). Guys are used to control the ends of other spars such as spinnaker poles. Lines used to tie a boat up when alongside are called docklines, docking cables, or mooring warps. A rode is what attaches an anchored boat to its anchor. Other than starboard and port, the sides of the boat are defined by their relationship to the wind. The terms to describe the two sides are Windward and leeward. The windward side of the boat is the upwind side, while the leeward side is the side that is downwind.

=== Management of lines ===
The following knots are commonly used to handle ropes and lines on sailing craft:

- Bowline – forms a loop at the end of a rope or line, useful for lassoing a piling.
- Cleat hitch – affixes a line to a cleat, used with docking lines.
- Clove hitch – two half hitches, used for tying onto a post or hanging a fender.
- Figure-eight – a stopper knot, prevents a line from sliding past the opening in a fitting.
- Rolling hitch – a friction hitch onto a line or a spar that pulls in one direction and slides in the other.
- Sheet bend – joins two rope ends when improvising a longer line.
- Reef knot or square knot – used for reefing or storing a sail by tying two ends of a line together.

Lines and halyards are typically coiled neatly for stowage and reuse.

== Sail physics ==
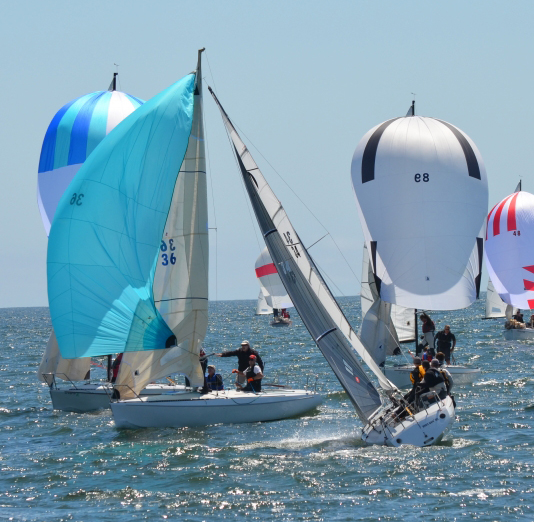
Aerodynamic force components for two points of sail. Left-hand boat: Down wind with detached airflow like a parachute— predominant drag component propels the boat with little heeling moment. Right-hand boat: Upwind (close-hauled) with attached airflow like a wing—predominant lift component both propels the boat and contributes to heel.

The physics of sailing arises from a balance of forces between the wind powering the sailing craft as it passes over its sails and the resistance by the sailing craft against being blown off course, which is provided in the water by the keel, rudder, underwater foils and other elements of the underbody of a sailboat, on ice by the runners of an iceboat, or on land by the wheels of a sail-powered land vehicle.

Forces on sails depend on wind speed and direction, and the speed and direction of the craft. The speed of the craft at a given point of sail contributes to the "apparent wind"—the wind speed and direction as measured on the moving craft. The apparent wind on the sail creates a total aerodynamic force, which may be resolved into drag—the force component in the direction of the apparent wind—and lift—the force component normal (90°) to the apparent wind. Depending on the alignment of the sail with the apparent wind (angle of attack), lift or drag may be the predominant propulsive component. Depending on the angle of attack of a set of sails with respect to the apparent wind, each sail provides motive force to the sailing craft either from lift-dominant attached flow or drag-dominant separated flow. Additionally, sails may interact with one another to create forces that are different from the sum of the individual contributions of each sail when used alone.

=== Apparent wind velocity ===
The term "velocity" refers both to speed and direction. As applied to wind, apparent wind velocity (V_{A}) is the air velocity acting upon the leading edge of the most forward sail or as experienced by instrumentation or crew on a moving sailing craft. In nautical terminology, wind speeds are normally expressed in knots and wind angles in degrees. All sailing craft reach a constant forward velocity (V_{B}) for a given true wind velocity (V_{T}) and point of sail. The craft's point of sail affects its velocity for a given true wind velocity. Conventional sailing craft cannot derive power from the wind in a "no-go" zone that is approximately 40° to 50° away from the true wind, depending on the craft. Likewise, the directly downwind speed of all conventional sailing craft is limited to the true wind speed. As a sailboat sails further from the wind, the apparent wind becomes smaller, and the lateral component becomes less; boat speed is highest on the beam reach. To act like an airfoil, the sail on a sailboat is sheeted further out as the course is further off the wind. As an iceboat sails further from the wind, the apparent wind increases slightly and the boat speed is highest on the broad reach. To act like an airfoil, the sail on an iceboat is sheeted in for all three points of sail.

=== Lift and drag on sails ===
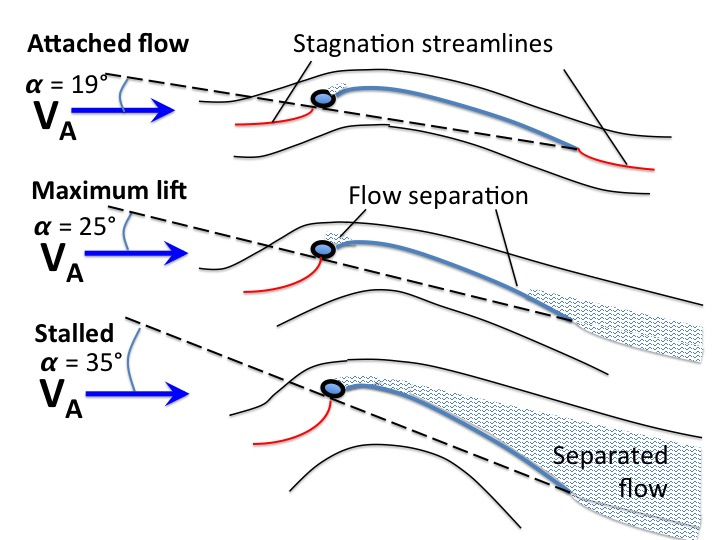
Sail angles of attack (α) and resulting (idealized) flow patterns for attached flow, maximum lift, and stalled for a hypothetical sail. The stagnation streamlines (red) delineate air passing to the leeward side (top) from that passing to the windward (bottom) side of the sail.

Lift on a sail, acting as an airfoil, occurs in a direction perpendicular to the incident airstream (the apparent wind velocity for the headsail) and is a result of pressure differences between the windward and leeward surfaces and depends on the angle of attack, sail shape, air density, and speed of the apparent wind. The lift force results from the average pressure on the windward surface of the sail being higher than the average pressure on the leeward side. These pressure differences arise in conjunction with the curved airflow. As air follows a curved path along the windward side of a sail, there is a pressure gradient perpendicular to the flow direction with higher pressure on the outside of the curve and lower pressure on the inside. To generate lift, a sail must present an "angle of attack" between the chord line of the sail and the apparent wind velocity. The angle of attack is a function of both the craft's point of sail and how the sail is adjusted with respect to the apparent wind.

As the lift generated by a sail increases, so does lift-induced drag, which together with parasitic drag constitute total drag, which acts in a direction parallel to the incident airstream. This occurs as the angle of attack increases with sail trim or change of course and causes the lift coefficient to increase up to the point of aerodynamic stall along with the lift-induced drag coefficient. At the onset of stall, lift is abruptly decreased, as is lift-induced drag. Sails with the apparent wind behind them (especially going downwind) operate in a stalled condition.

Lift and drag are components of the total aerodynamic force on the sail, which are resisted by forces in the water (for a boat) or on the traveled surface (for an iceboat or land sailing craft). Sails act in two basic modes: under the lift-predominant mode, the sail behaves in a manner analogous to a wing with airflow attached to both surfaces; under the drag-predominant mode, the sail acts in a manner analogous to a parachute with airflow in detached flow, eddying around the sail.

==== Lift predominance (wing mode) ====
Sails allow progress of a sailing craft to windward, thanks to their ability to generate lift (and the craft's ability to resist the lateral forces that result). Each sail configuration has characteristic coefficients of lift and drag, which can be determined experimentally and calculated theoretically. Sailing craft orient their sails with a favorable angle of attack between the entry point of the sail and the apparent wind, even as their course changes. The ability to generate lift is limited by sailing too close to the wind when no effective angle of attack is available to generate lift (causing luffing) and sailing sufficiently off the wind that the sail cannot be oriented at a favorable angle of attack to prevent the sail from stalling with flow separation.

==== Drag predominance (parachute mode) ====
When sailing craft are on a course where the angle between the sail and the apparent wind (the angle of attack) exceeds the point of maximum lift, separation of flow occurs. Drag increases and lift decreases with increasing angle of attack as the separation becomes progressively pronounced until the sail is perpendicular to the apparent wind, when lift becomes negligible, and drag predominates. In addition to the sails used upwind, spinnakers provide area and curvature appropriate for sailing with separated flow on downwind points of sail, analogous to parachutes, which provide both lift and drag.

Downwind sailing with a spinnaker

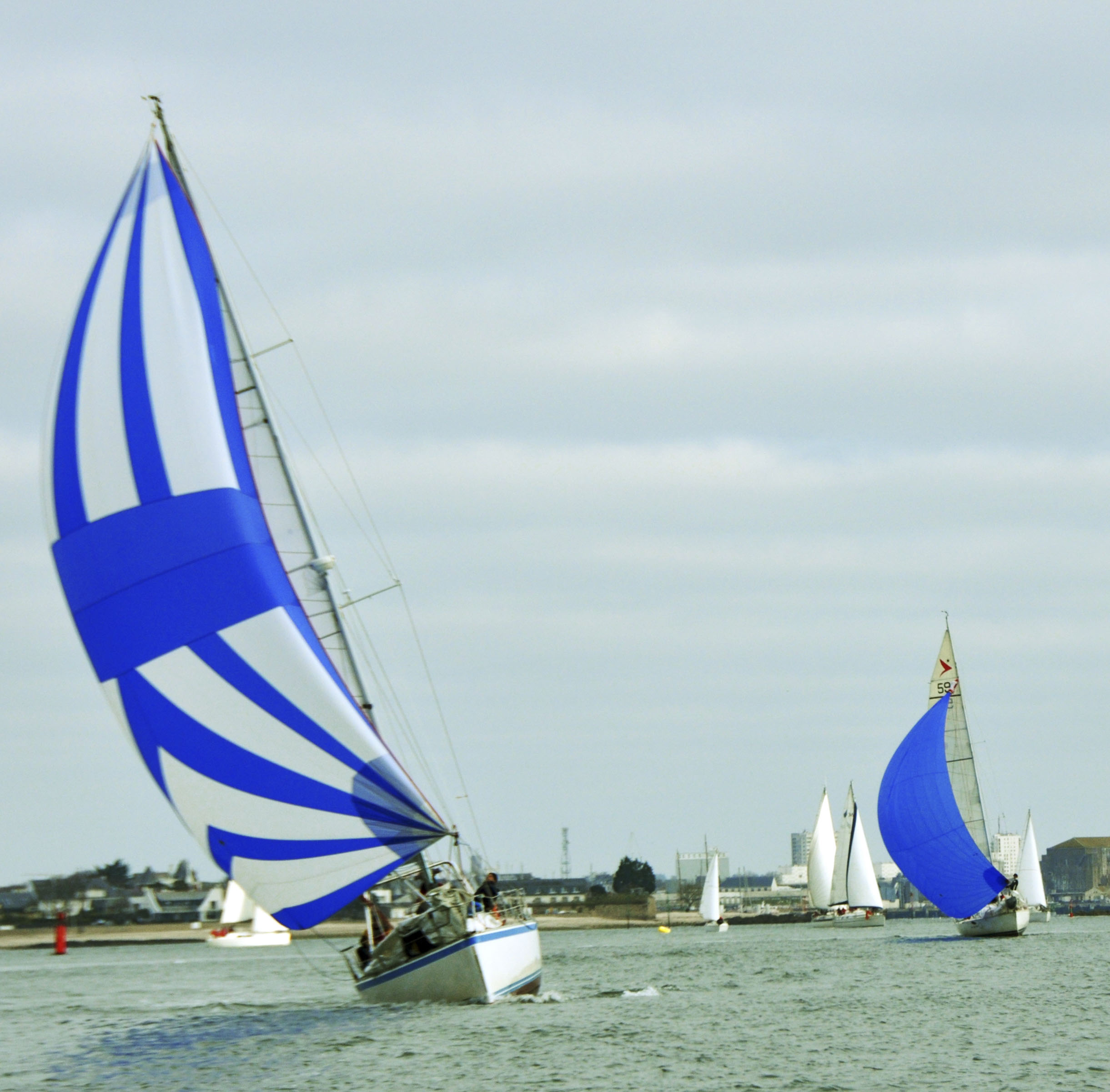
Spinnaker set for a broad reach, generating both lift, with separated flow, and drag.

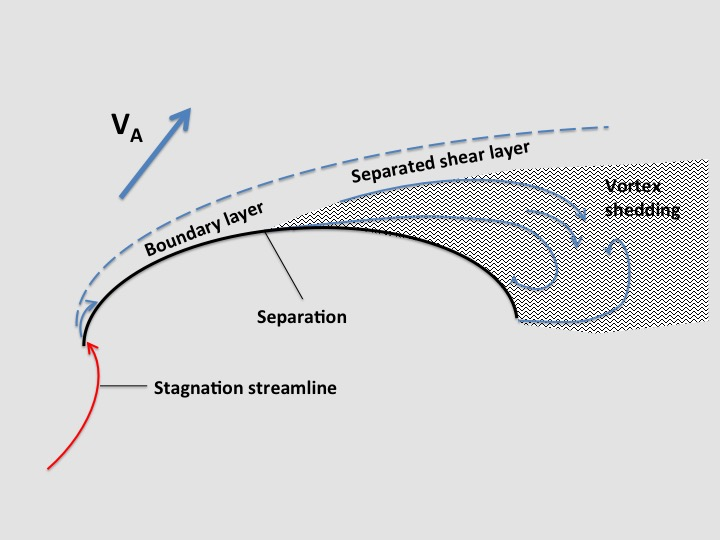
Spinnaker cross-section trimmed for a broad reach showing transition from boundary layer to separated flow where vortex shedding commences.

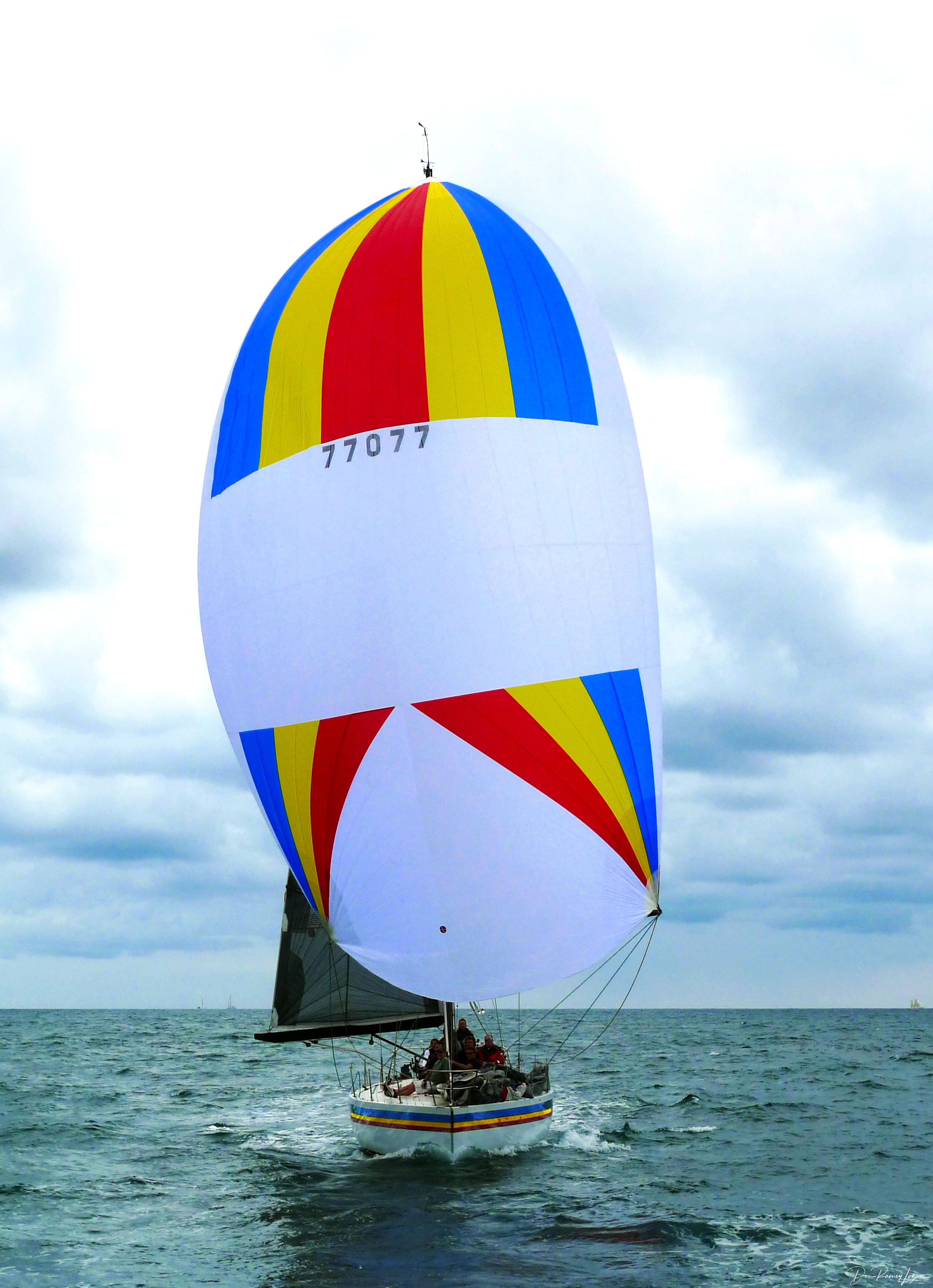
Symmetric spinnaker while running downwind, primarily generating drag.

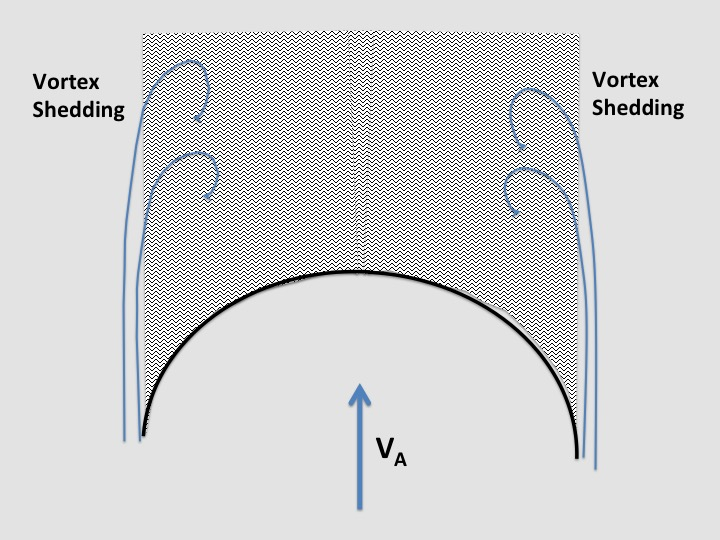
Symmetrical spinnaker cross-section with following apparent wind, showing vortex shedding.

==== Wind variation with height and time ====
Wind speed increases with height above the surface; at the same time, it may vary over short periods as gusts.

Wind shear affects sailing craft in motion by presenting a different wind speed and direction at different heights along the mast. Wind shear occurs because of friction above a water surface, slowing the flow of air. The ratio of wind at the surface to wind at a height above the surface varies by a power law with an exponent of 0.11-0.13 over the ocean. This means that a 5 m/s (9.7 kn) wind at 3 m above the water would be approximately 6 m/s (12 kn) at 15 m (50 ft) above the water. In hurricane-force winds with 40 m/s (78 kn) at the surface the speed at 15 m (50 ft) would be 49 m/s (95 kn) This suggests that sails that reach higher above the surface can be subject to stronger wind forces that move the centre of effort on them higher above the surface and increase the heeling moment. Additionally, apparent wind direction moves aft with height above water, which may necessitate a corresponding twist in the shape of the sail to achieve attached flow with height.

Gusts may be predicted using the same value that serves as the exponent for wind shear, acting as a gust factor. So, one can expect gusts to be about 1.5 times stronger than the prevailing wind speed (a 10-knot wind might gust up to 15 knots). This, combined with changes in wind direction, suggests the degree to which a sailing craft must adjust its sail angle to wind gusts on a given course.

== Hull physics ==
Waterborne sailing craft rely on the design of the hull and keel to provide minimal forward drag in opposition to the sails' propulsive power and maximum resistance to the sails' lateral forces. In modern sailboats, drag is minimized by control of the hull's shape (blunt or fine), appendages, and slipperiness. The keel and other underwater foils provide lateral resistance to the forces on the sails. Heeling increases both drag and the boat's ability to track along its desired course. Wave generation for a displacement hull is another important limitation on boat speed.

=== Drag ===
Drag from its form is described by a prismatic coefficient, C_{p} = displaced volume of the vessel divided by waterline length times maximum displaced section area—the maximum value of C_{p} = 1.0 being for a constant displace cross section area, as would be found on a barge. For modern sailboats, values of 0.53 ≤ C_{p} ≤ 0.6 are likely because of the tapered shape of the submerged hull towards both ends. Reducing interior volume allows creating a finer hull with less drag. Because a keel or other underwater foil produces lift, it also produces drag, which increases as the boat heels. The wetted area of the hull affects the total friction between the water and the hull's surface, creating another component of drag.

=== Lateral resistance ===
Sailboats use some sort of underwater foil to generate lift that maintains the forward direction of the boat under sail. Whereas sails operate at angles of attack between 10° and 90° incident to the wind, underwater foils operate at angles of attack between 0° and 10° incident to the water passing by. Neither their angle of attack nor surface is adjustable (except for moveable foils), and they are never intentionally stalled while making way through the water. Heeling the vessel away from perpendicular into the water significantly degrades the boat's ability to point into the wind.

=== Hull speed and beyond ===
Hull speed is the speed at which the wavelength of a vessel's bow wave is equal to its waterline length and is proportional to the square root of the vessel's length at the waterline. Applying more power does not significantly increase the speed of a displacement vessel beyond hull speed. This is because the vessel is climbing an increasingly steep bow wave as power is added, without the wave propagating forward faster.

Planing and foiling vessels are not limited by hull speed, as they rise out of the water without building a bow wave with the application of power. Long, narrow hulls, such as those of catamarans, surpass hull speed by piercing through the bow wave. Hull speed does not apply to sailing craft on ice runners or wheels because they do not displace water.

== See also ==
- Dinghy racing
- High-performance sailing
- Land sailing
- Racing Rules of Sailing
- Sailing at the Summer Olympics
- Single-handed sailing

== Bibliography ==
- "Transportation and Maps" in Virtual Vault, an online exhibition of Canadian historical art at Library and Archives Canada
- Rousmaniere, John, The Annapolis Book of Seamanship, Simon & Schuster, 1999
- Chapman Book of Piloting (various contributors), Hearst Corporation, 1999
- Herreshoff, Halsey (consulting editor), The Sailor's Handbook, Little Brown and Company, 1983
- Seidman, David, The Complete Sailor, International Marine, 1995
- Jobson, Gary (2008). Sailing Fundamentals (Revised ed.). Simon and Schuster. p. 224. ISBN 9781439136782.
