= Cleat hitch =

Type of hitch knot

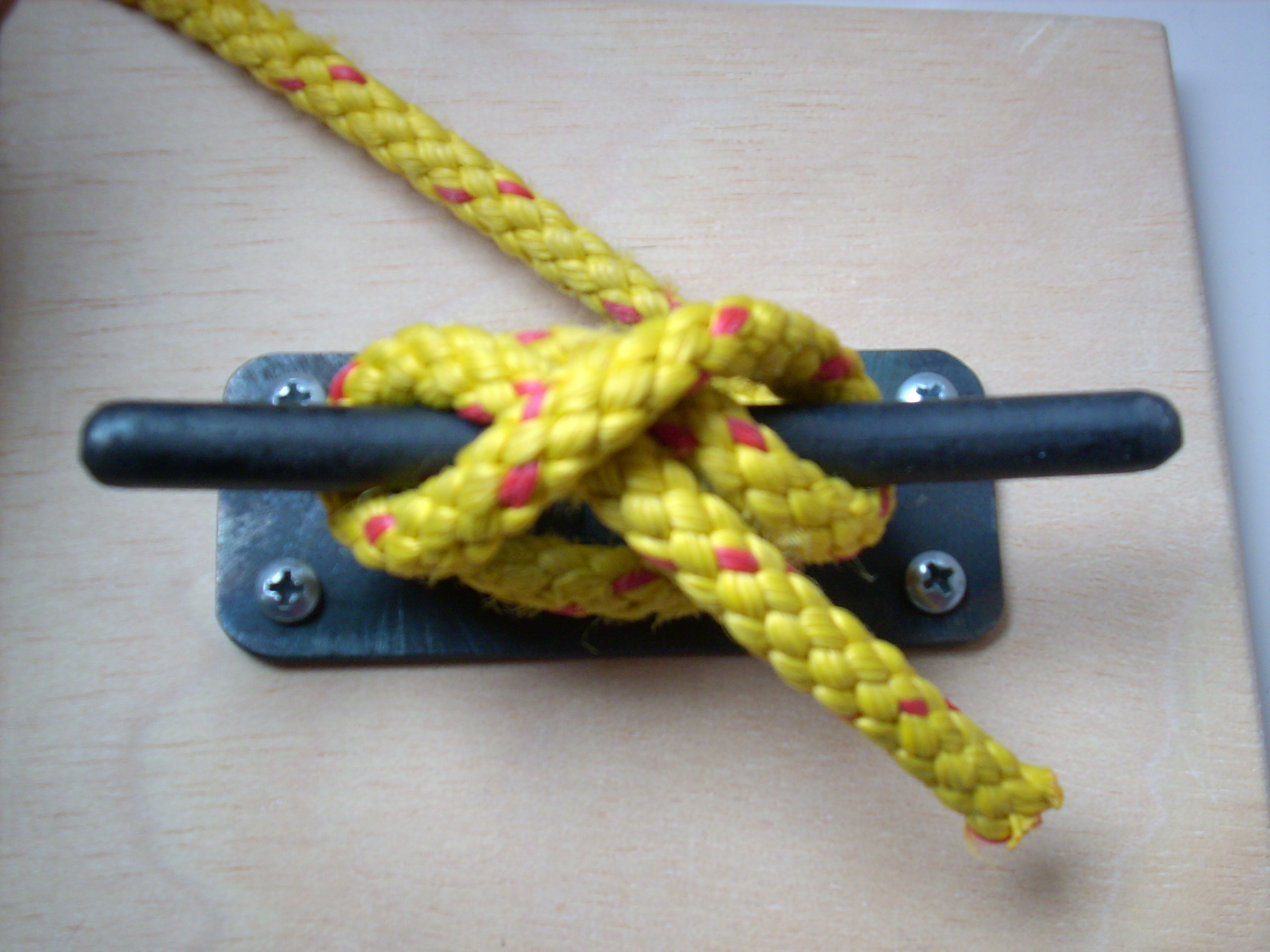
- Names: Cleat hitch, cleat knot, cleat tie
- Category: Hitch
- Origin: Nautical
- Releasing: Non-jamming
- ABoK: #1615
- Instructions

The cleat hitch is a knot for securely attaching a rope to a cleat.

== Tying ==
The hitch begins with a dead turn around the cleat then continues forming an “8”. The hitch is finished with an inverted half hitch.

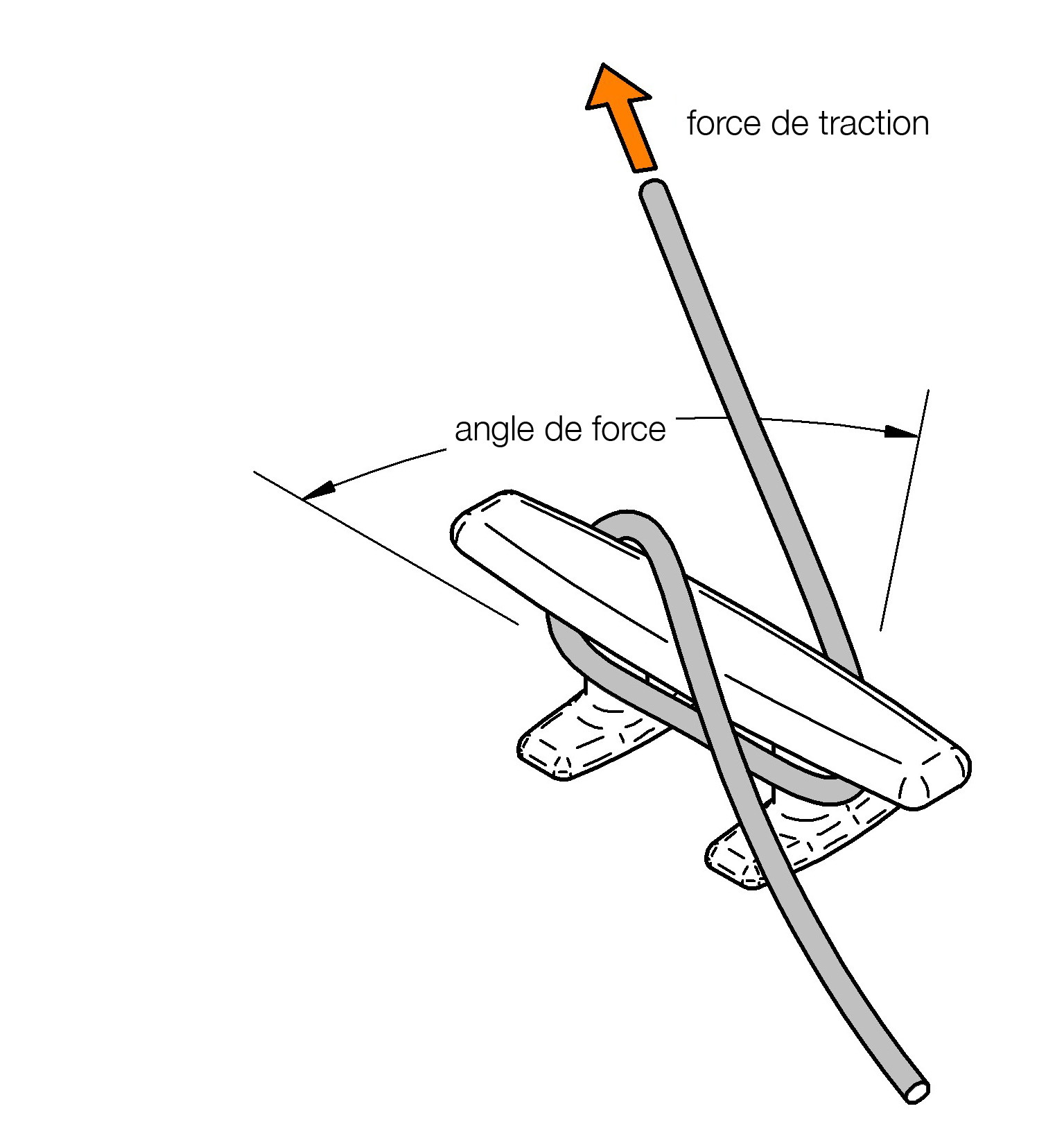
A dead turn

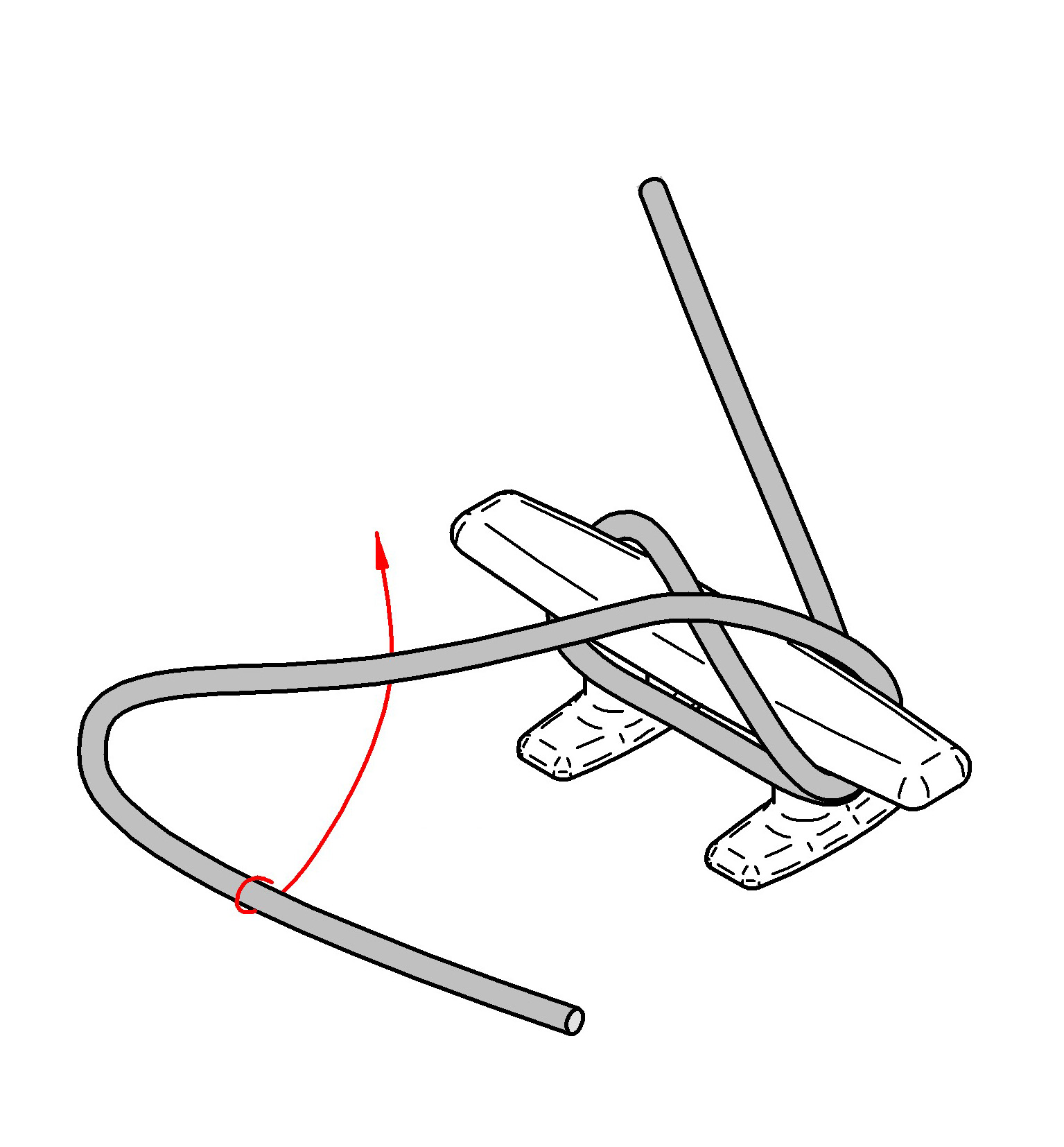
We cross by making an eight

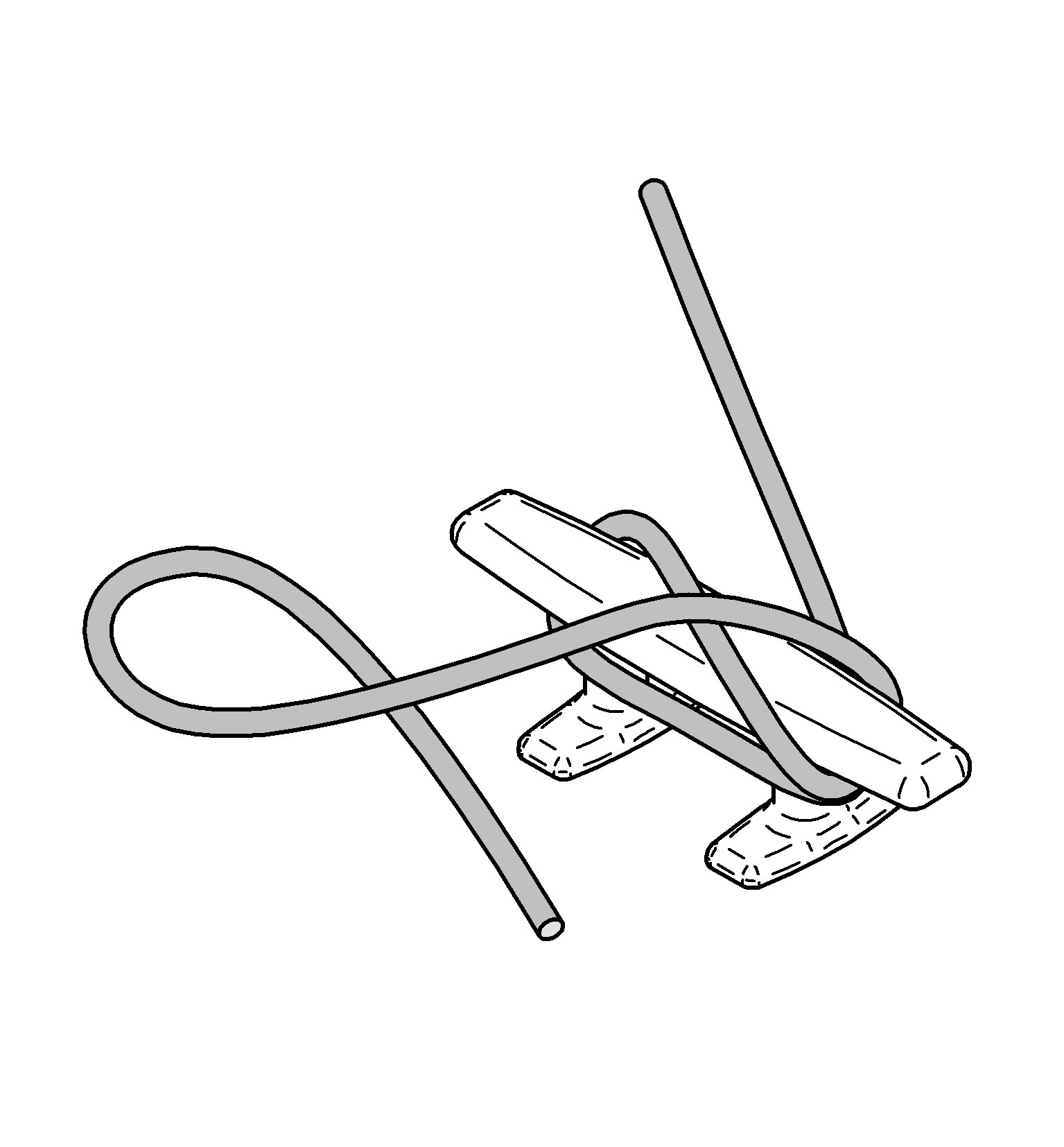
Prepare the reverse half hitch

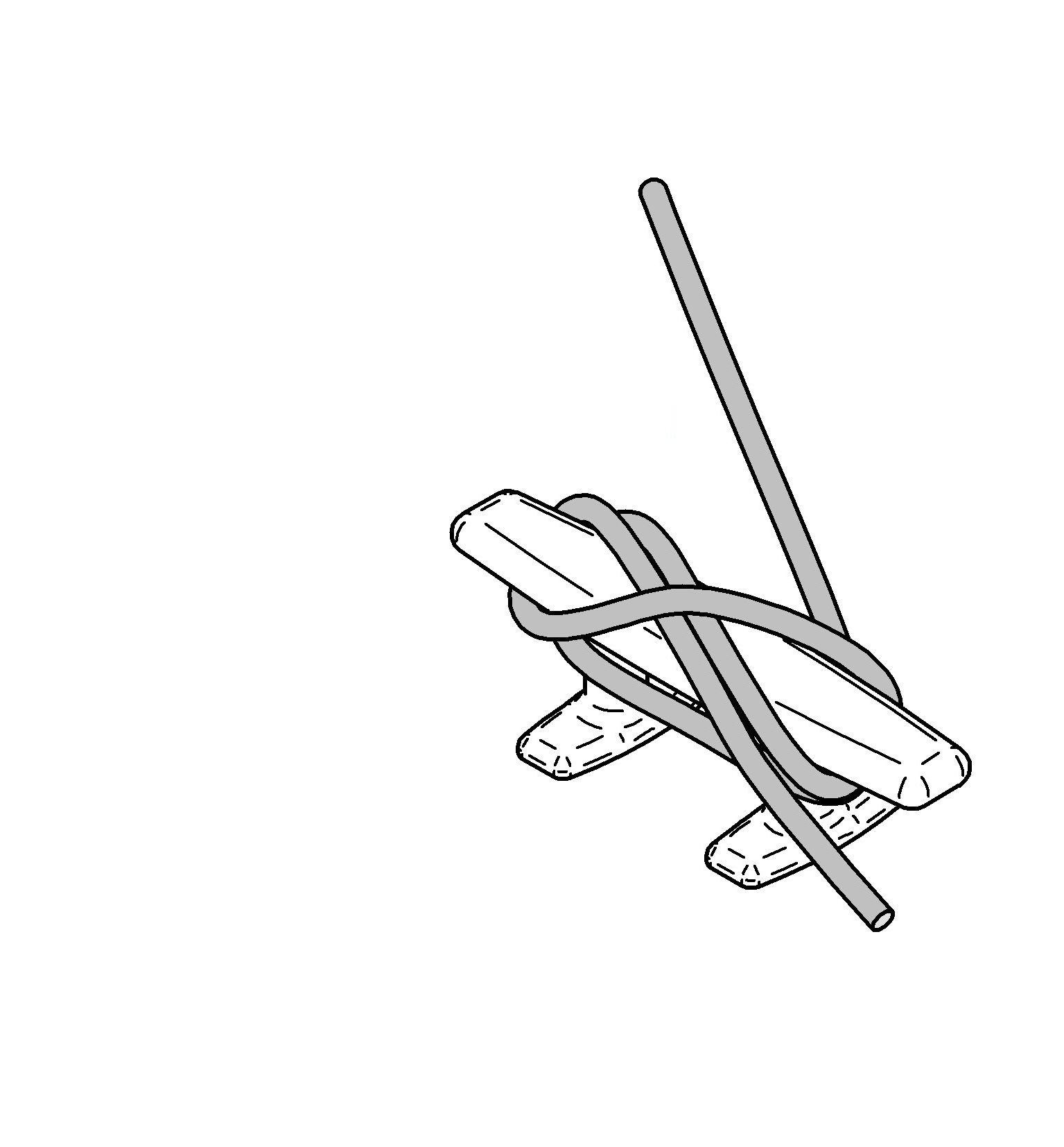
The finished knot

== See also ==
- List of knots
- Cleat
- Clove hitch

== Bibliography ==
- Ashley, Clifford W. (1993) [1944], The Ashley Book of Knots, New York: Doubleday, p. Dust jacket, ISBN 0-385-04025-3 p.286
- Compton, Nic (2013), The Knot Bible, The complete guide to knots and their uses, London: Adlard Coles Nautical, ISBN 978-1-4081-5476-2 p.66
- Soles, Clyde (2011), Backpacker magazine’s outdoor knots : the knots you need to know, Morris Book Publishing, LLC, ISBN 978-0-7627-5651-3 p.72
