= Cleat (nautical) =

Rope-securing device

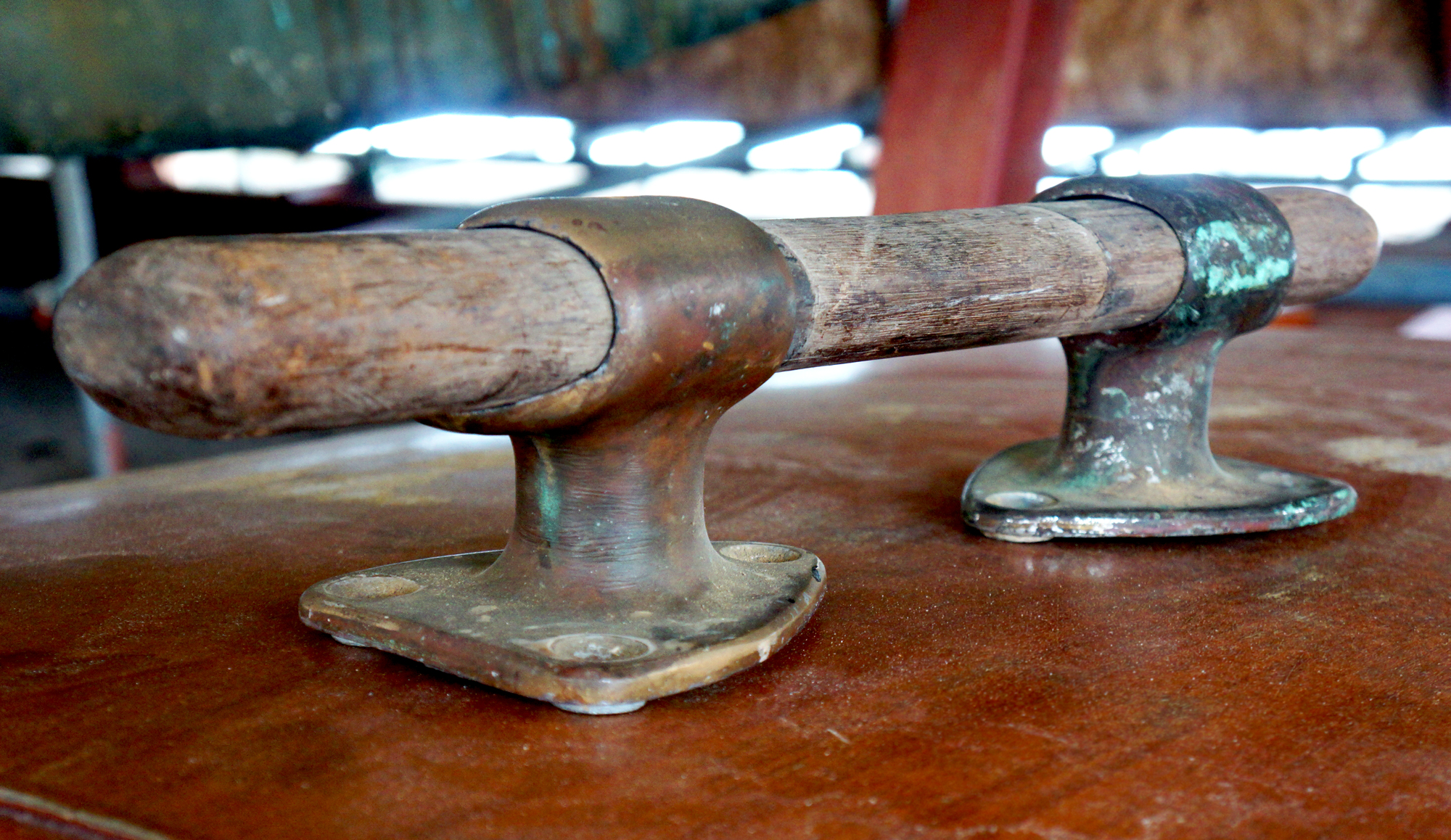
An original cleat from HMY Britannia

In nautical contexts, a cleat is a device for securing a rope.

== Types ==
Types of cleat designs include the following:

- A horn cleat is the traditional design, featuring two "horns" extending parallel to the deck or the axis of the spar, attached to a flat surface or a spar, and resembling an anvil.
- A cam cleat in which one or two spring-loaded cams pinch the rope, allowing the rope to be adjusted easily, and quickly released when under load.
- A jam cleat in which the line is pinched in a v-shaped slot.
- A clam cleat (or jam cleat) in which the rope is held between two fluted stationary pieces. Such a cleat vaguely resembles two halves of a clam shell held back to back. It is more compact than a cam cleat, but the rope is less easily released under load.

A cleat hitch is a knot used to secure a rope to a cleat.

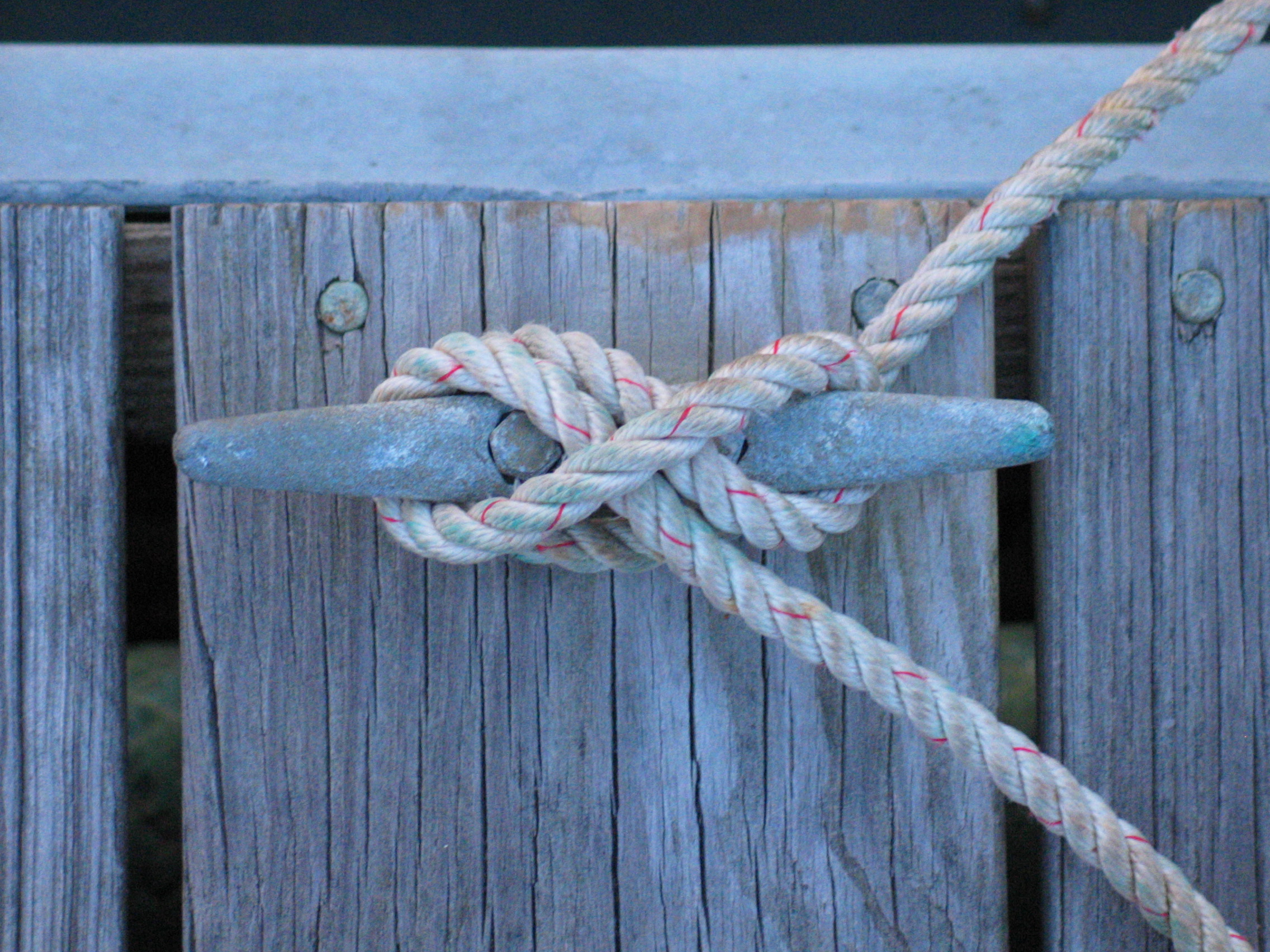
A line tied with a cleat hitch to a horn cleat on a dock. The line comes from a boat off the top of the picture, around the right horn, around the left horn, across the cleat from top left to bottom right, around the right horn, and then hitches around the left horn. Note that this line is tied improperly; the line from the boat should initially run to the far (left) side of the horn cleat rather than close (right) side.

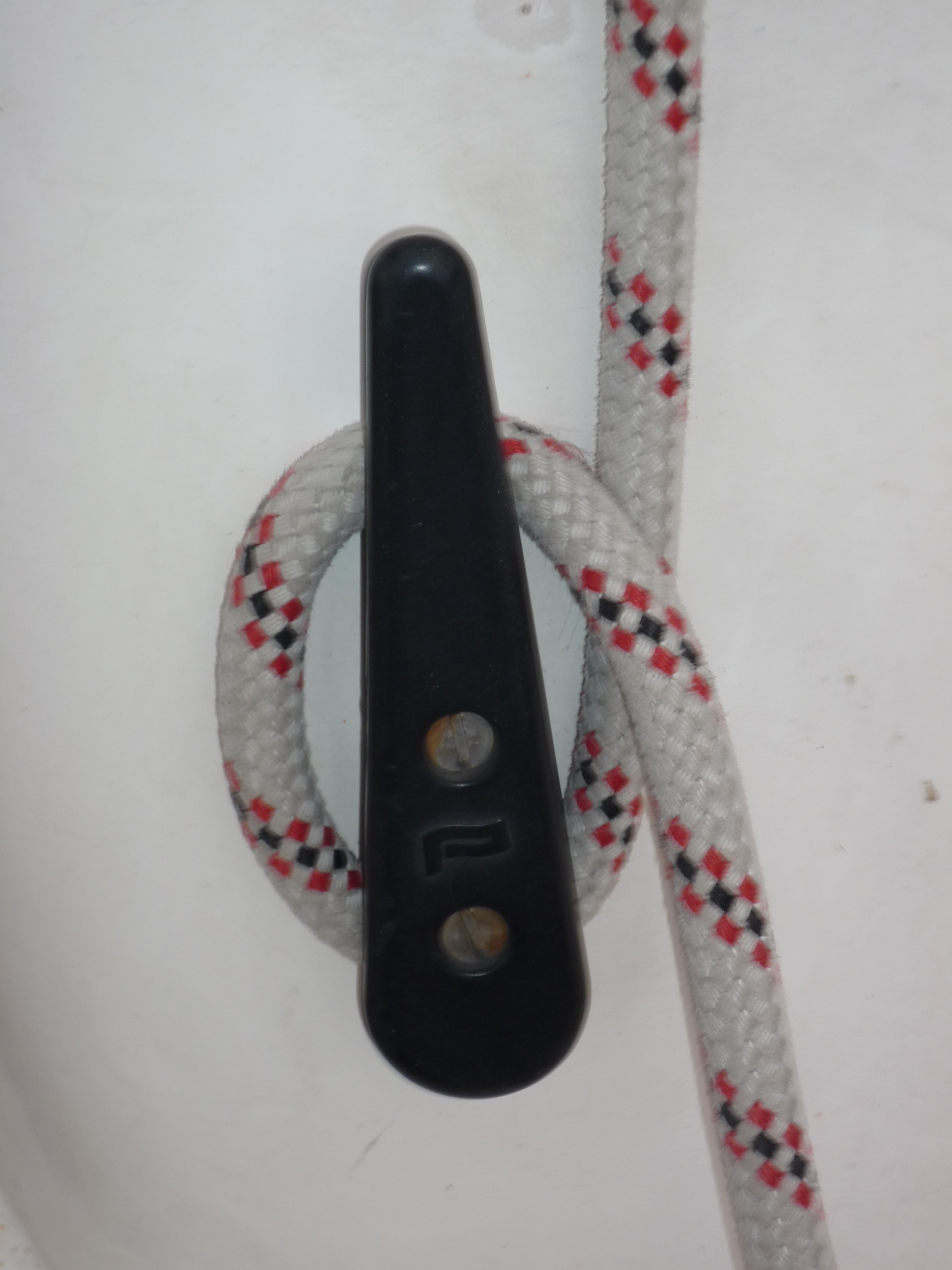
A jam cleat. The rope is free to run around the lower part of the cleat (below the screws). The upper part is tapered so that the space between the cleat and the boat gets smaller closer to the screws, causing the rope to jam in the cleat when it is pulled downward.

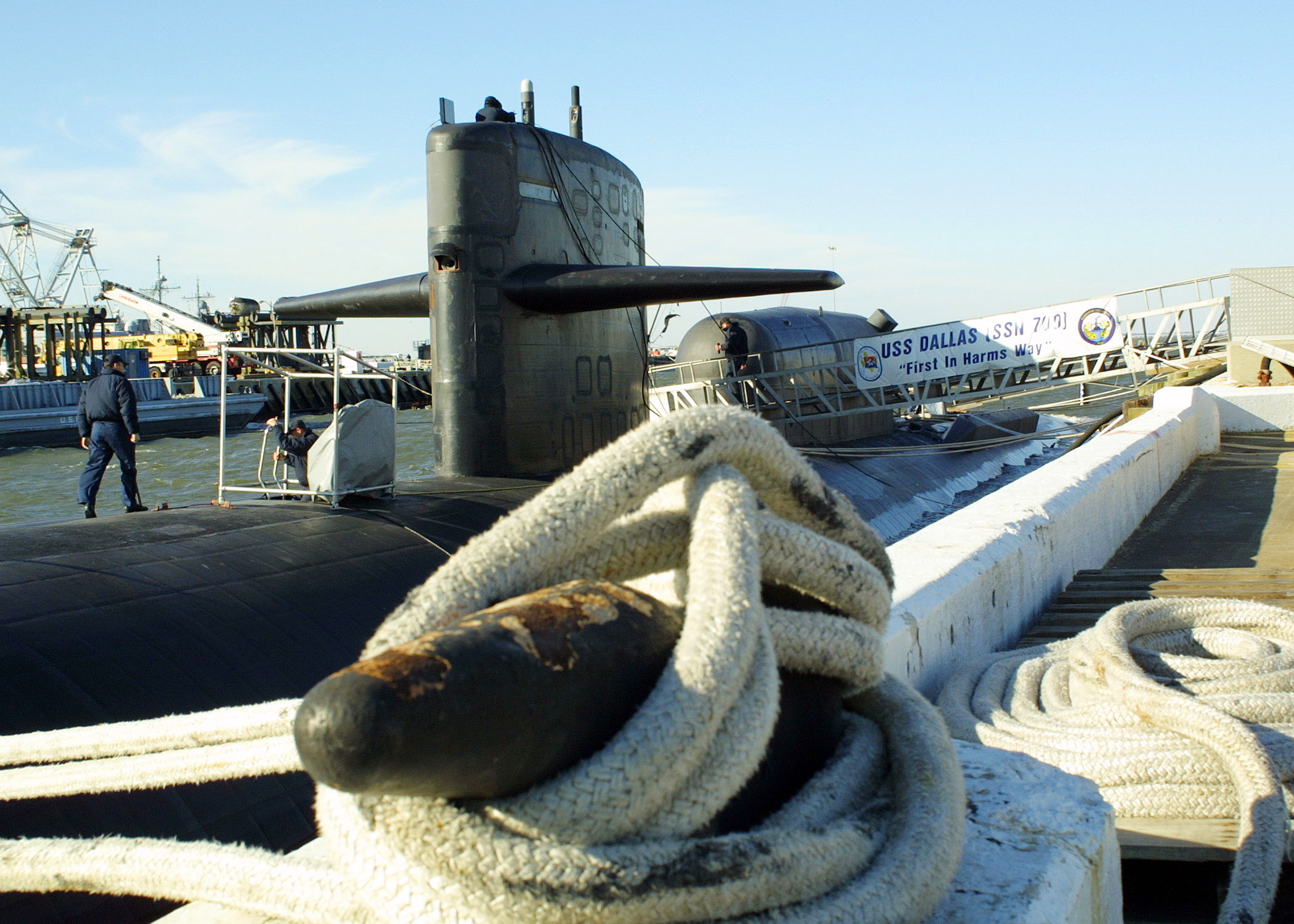
A large mooring cleat

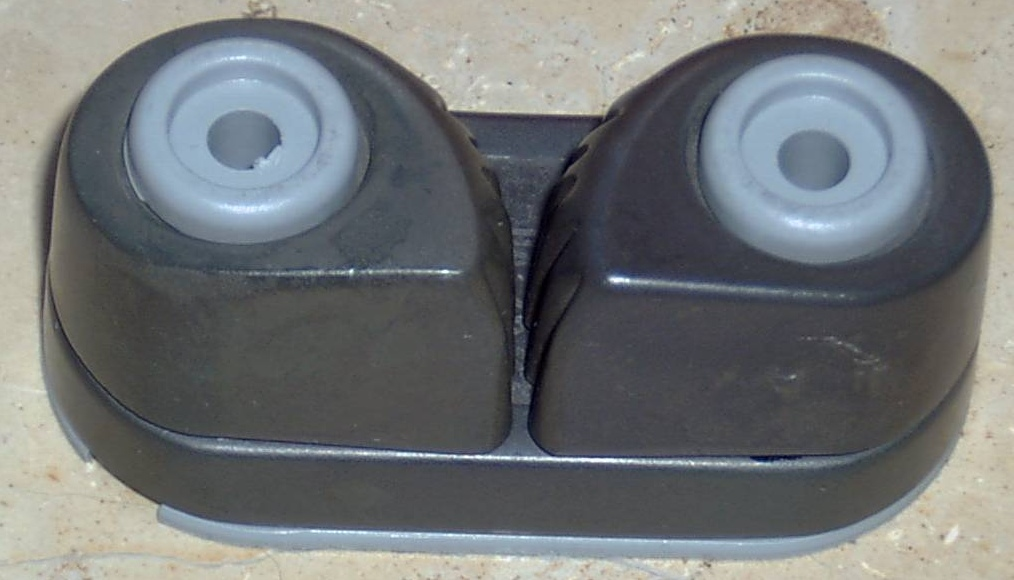
Cam cleat: the rope passes between two cams, which resist a pull in a direction away from the camera.
