= Sun Odyssey 45 =

Sailboat class

Development
- Designer: Philippe Briand; Jeanneau Design Office
- Location: France
- Year: 2004
- Builder: Jeanneau
- Role: Cruiser
- Name: Sun Odyssey 45

Boat
- Displacement: 21,826 lb (9,900 kg)
- Draft: 6.73 ft (2.05 m)

Hull
- Type: monohull
- Construction: fiberglass
- LOA: 45.01 ft (13.72 m)
- LWL: 38.09 ft (11.61 m)
- Beam: 14.34 ft (4.37 m)
- Engine: Yanmar diesel engine

Hull appendages
- Keel: fin keel
- Ballast: 6,504 lb (2,950 kg)
- Rudder: spade-type rudder

Rig
- Rig type: Bermuda rig

Sails
- Sailplan: fractional rigged sloop masthead sloop
- Total sail area: 1,082.85 sq ft (100.600 m^{2})

Racing
- PHRF: 60-75

The Sun Odyssey 45 is a French sailboat that was designed by Philippe Briand and the Jeanneau Design Office as a cruiser and for the yacht charter market. It was first built in 2004.

== Production ==
The design was built by Jeanneau in France, from 2004 until 2009, but it is now out of production.

== Design ==
The Sun Odyssey 45 is a recreational keelboat, built predominantly of fiberglass and Kevlar, with wood trim. It has a fractional sloop rig, with a Z-Spar mast, two sets of spreaders and aluminum spars with stainless steel wire rigging. The hull has a raked stem, a reverse transom with a swimming platform, an internally mounted spade-type rudder controlled by dual wheels and a fixed fin keel, deep draft keel or optional shoal-draft keel. The fin keel version displaces 21,826 lb (9,900 kg) and carries 6,504 lb (2,950 kg) of cast iron ballast.

The boat has a draft of 6.73 ft (2.05 m) with the standard keel, 5.40 ft (1.65 m) with the optional shoal draft keel and 7.54 ft (2.30 m) with the optional "performance" deep draft keel. The "performance" version also has a taller mast, increased sail area, a racing adjustable backstay, a racing roller furler, an abbreviated pulpit and folding engine propeller to reduce drag.

The boat is fitted with a Japanese Yanmar diesel engine for docking and maneuvering. The fuel tank holds 63 U.S. gallons (240 L; 52 imp gal) and the fresh water tank has a capacity of 119 U.S. gallons (450 L; 99 imp gal).

The design has sleeping accommodation for four to eight people. The two cabin layout has a double island berth in the bow cabin, two U-shaped settees in the main cabin and an aft cabin with a double island berth. Both the bow and aft cabins may be subdivided to make four cabins. The galley is located on the starboard side at the companionway ladder. The galley is of straight configuration or optionally L-shaped, and is equipped with a stove, a refrigerator, freezer and a double sink. A navigation station is opposite the galley, on the port side. There are two heads, one in the bow cabin on the starboard side and one on the port side, aft. Cabin headroom is 78 in (198 cm).

The design has a PHRF handicap of 60 to 75.

== Operational history ==
The boat is supported by an active class club, the Jeanneau Owners Network.

In a 2008 Sailing Magazine review, Dave Gendell wrote, "someone put a lot of thought and care into this design. This is an appealing hull that smartly and perfectly cloaks a spacious, well-lit interior. The interior is clean and European in design, but broad teak surfaces provide warmth and rich beauty. Several configurations are available below, and the "L-galley" layout aboard the test boat was created specifically for the U.S. market. Bring your friends, your kids and their friends; there is an abundance of storage space in the galley area, in the generous refrigerator and in the freezer. A four-cabin layout has been designed with a straight galley, which is popular in the chartering world. A full-sized nav station and inviting saloon table are also part of the spacious saloon."

== See also ==
- List of sailing boat types
