= Futtock shrouds =

Part of rigging of a ship

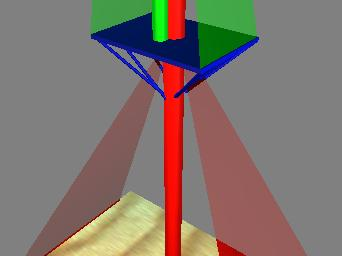
A top, with the futtock shrouds shown in blue beneath it.

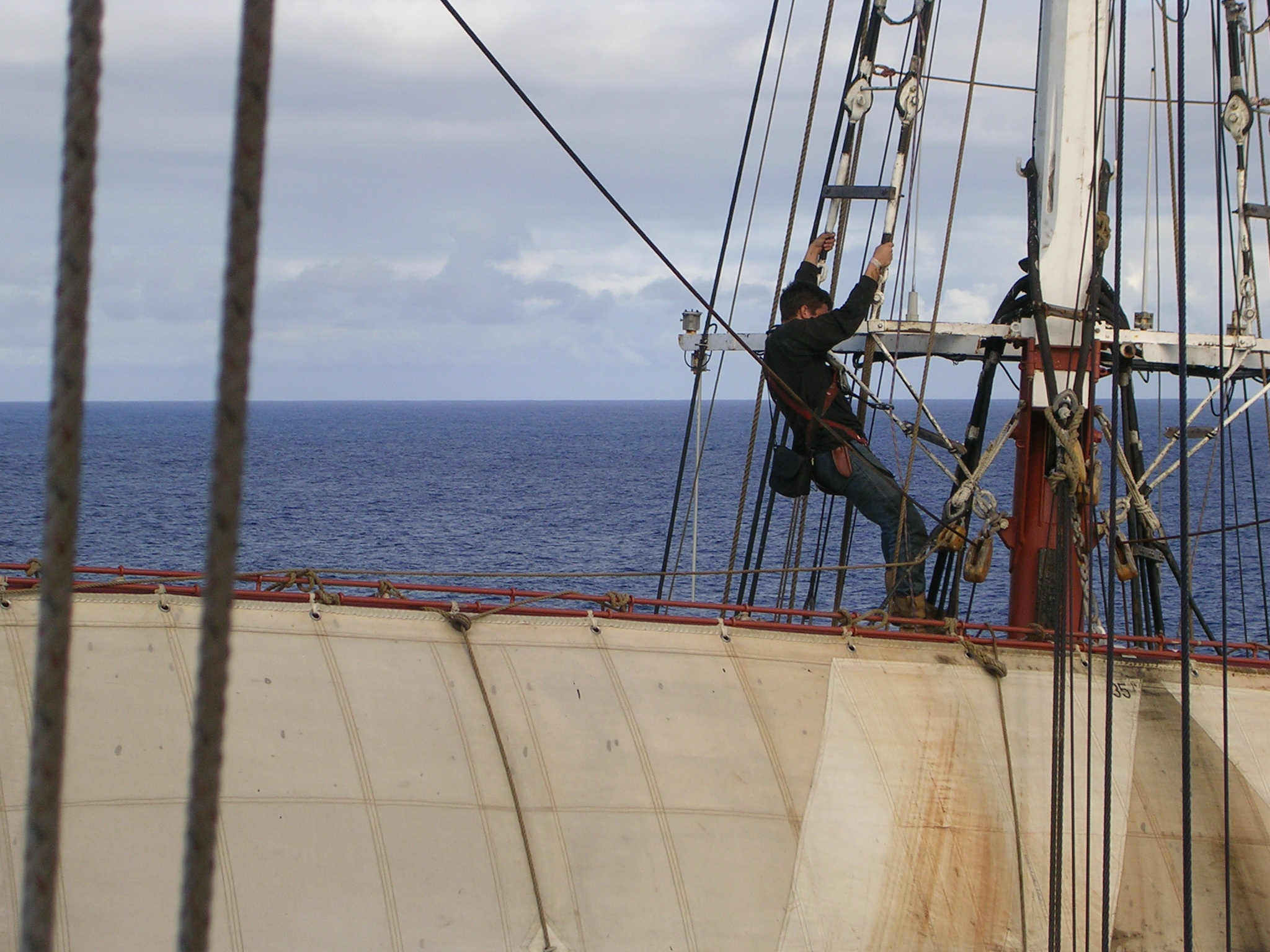
As well as tops, crosstrees will also have futtock shrouds. Because crosstrees are smaller, there is less need for alternatives to the futtock shrouds as a way past them. This sailor is about to climb out round the edges of the crosstrees using the futtock shrouds.

Futtock shrouds are rope, wire or chain links in the rigging of a traditional square rigged ship. They run from the outer edges of a top downwards and inwards to a point on the mast or lower shrouds, and carry the load of the shrouds that rise from the edge of the top. This prevents any tendency of the top itself to tilt relative to the mast.

== Climbing a ship's rigging ==
In the most traditional ships, the futtock shrouds can be used to gain access to the tops. Sailors ascend ratlines on the ordinary shrouds until nearly at the top, then transfer to the futtock shrouds which will be reaching upwards and outwards above them. Using the futtock shrouds involves climbing the underside of an overhanging rope at about 45 degrees. Futtock shrouds may or may not have ratlines.

As well as climbing the futtock shrouds, most ships also allowed access to the top through the "lubber's hole" at the tip of the ordinary ratlines. However, this was generally scorned by experienced sailors, and reserved for those on their first few trips aloft.

Any traditionally-rigged ship will have futtock shrouds, but on some modern ones they are strictly for structural purposes, with climbing forbidden. These ships may also dispense with lubbers' holes, and instead opt for a "Jacob's ladder" that descends from the edge of the top to the ratlines vertically, rather than overhanging like the futtock shrouds.

== Futtock band ==
In the mid-nineteenth century the futtock band was introduced, being a metal collar fitted to the mast below the top, to which the lower point of the futtock shrouds is attached. Before this the futtock shrouds were attached to the lower shrouds that rose directly to the top. In this arrangement lower shrouds must support a greater load, requiring the use of catharpins to provide bracing between port and starboard shrouds.

== Sources ==
- An Outline of the Practice of Ship-Building. Fincham, John; 1825 (page 196)
- The Elements of Wood Ship Construction. Curtis, W. H.; 1919 (pages 32-44)
- A Manual of Yacht and Boat Sailing. (Fourth Edition). Dixon, Kemp; 1884 (page 12)
