= Top (sailing ship) =

Platform at the upper end of a mast on a traditional square rigged ship

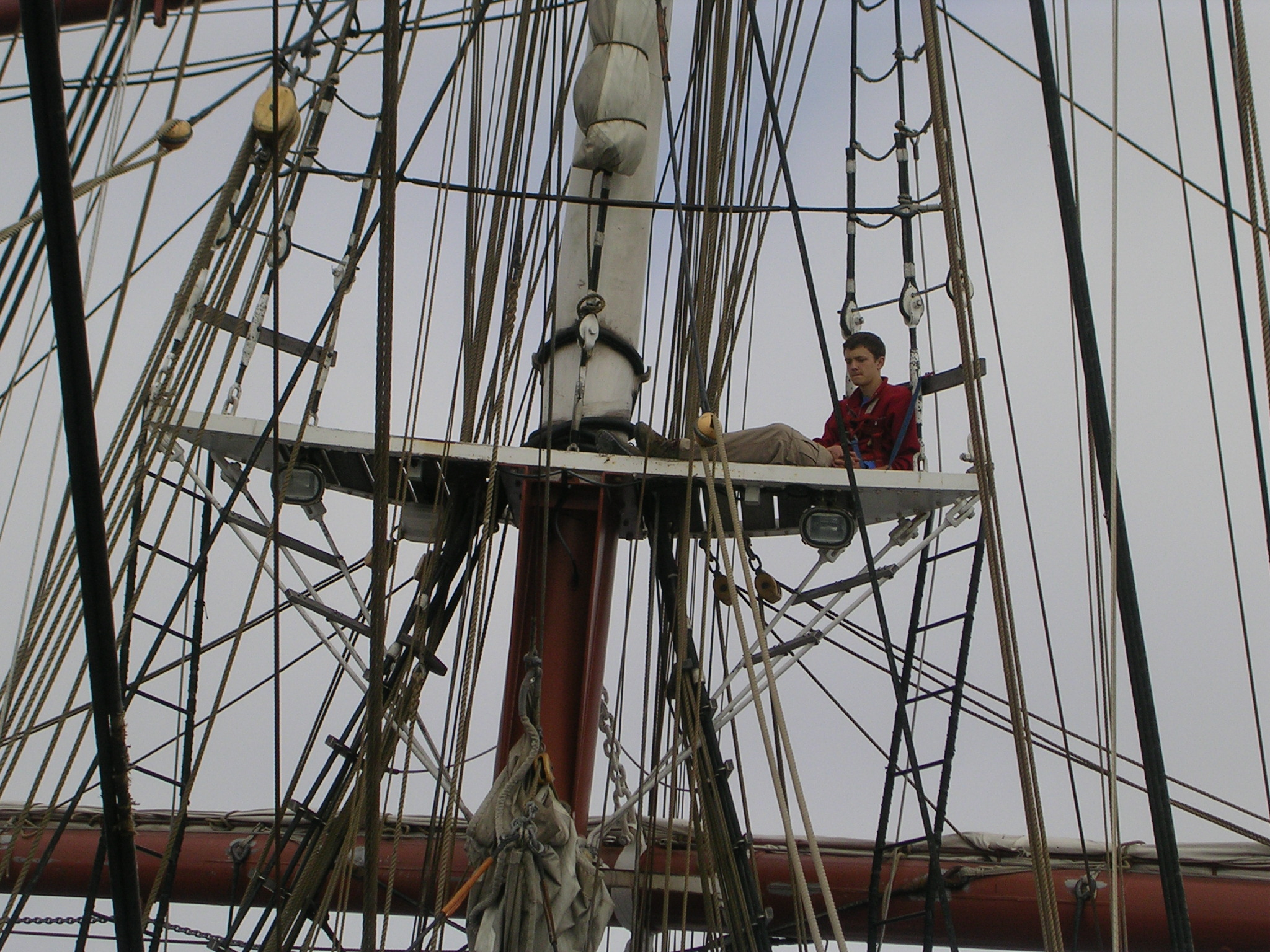
The foretop of the Prince William. Note the futtock shrouds (white-painted rods angling inwards) and jacob's ladders; extending upwards are the topmast shrouds with their rope ratlines.

The top on a traditional square rigged ship is the platform at the upper end of each (lower) mast. This is not the masthead "crow's nest" of the popular imagination – above the mainmast (for example) is the main-topmast, main-topgallant-mast and main-royal-mast, so that the top is actually about 1/4 to 1/3 of the way up the mast as a whole.

An important purpose of the top is to anchor the shrouds of the topmast that extends above it. Shrouds down to the side of the hull would be at too acute an angle from the mast, so crosstrees run sideways out from the mast to spread the topmast shrouds. These crosstrees rest on two trestle trees running fore and aft, which themselves are placed on top of the cheeks of hounds, bolted to the sides of the mast. Placing a few timbers onto the crosstrees produces a useful platform, the top. The futtock shrouds carry the load of the upper shrouds into the mast below.

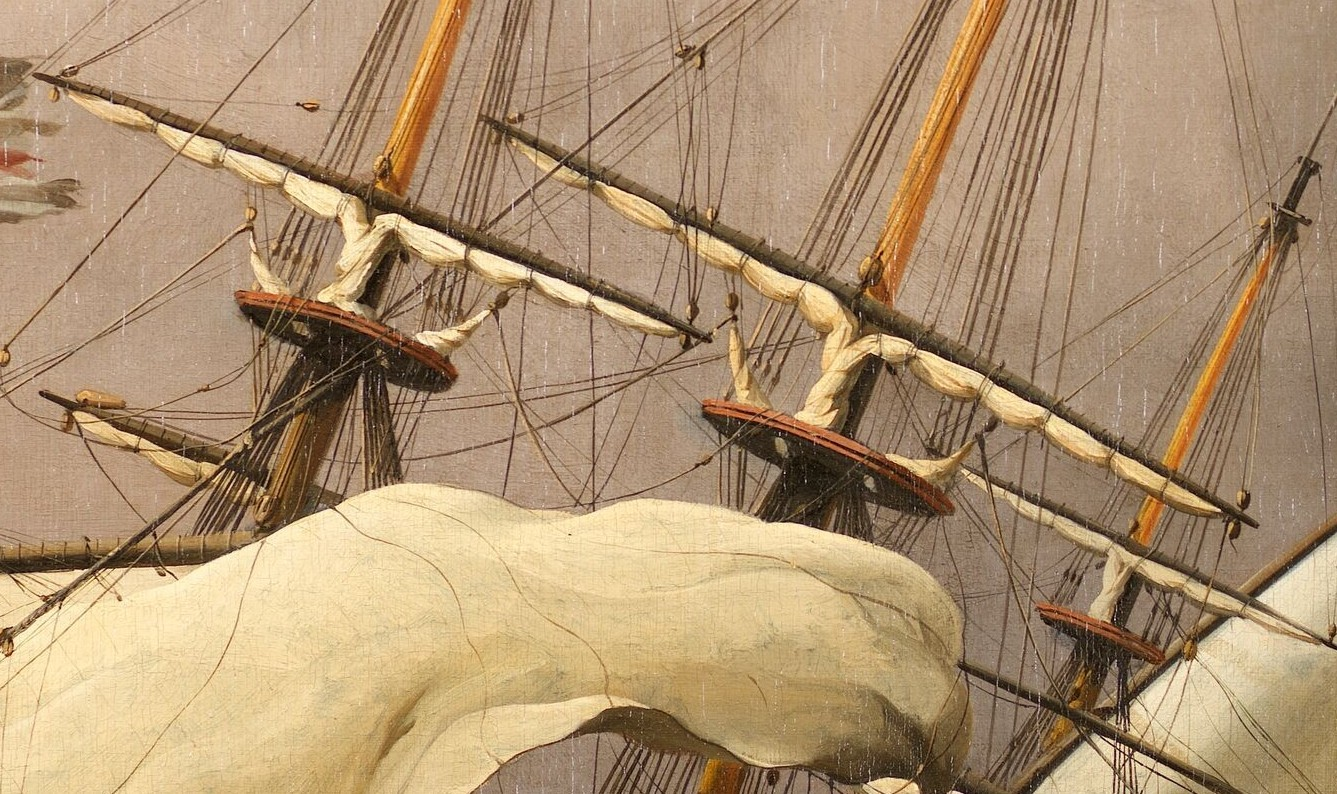
Detail of a painting of HMS Hampton Court showing how the tops are used for sail stowage

Up until late in the 17th century, the top served as a platform that assisted in sail handling. Prior to this time, square sails were stowed by lifting them up to the yard and in towards the mast. In contrast, the later stowage method simply pulled the sail up to the yard. The older method meant that much of the work was close to the mast, so the platform provided by the top greatly assisted this process. Other changes to sail handling at about the same time were the introduction of reefing (replacing the use of bonnets), the transition to the topsail to being the main working sail (first to be set and last to be handed), and the introduction of footropes.

At the upper end of the topmast and topgallant, there is a similar situation regarding the next mast up (topgallant and royal respectively). At these points a smaller top might be constructed, but it is more usual simply to leave the shroud-bearing struts open, in which case they are known as crosstrees.

Access for sailors to the top may be by a Jacob's ladder, lubber's hole, or the futtock shrouds.

A foremast might be stepped into a similar fore-top platform on the foremast. A mizzen-top would be a platform on the mizzenmast. Similar main-top and fore-top platforms have been retained on steam ships and motor vessels as preferred locations for installing rotating radar antennae.

== Fighting top ==
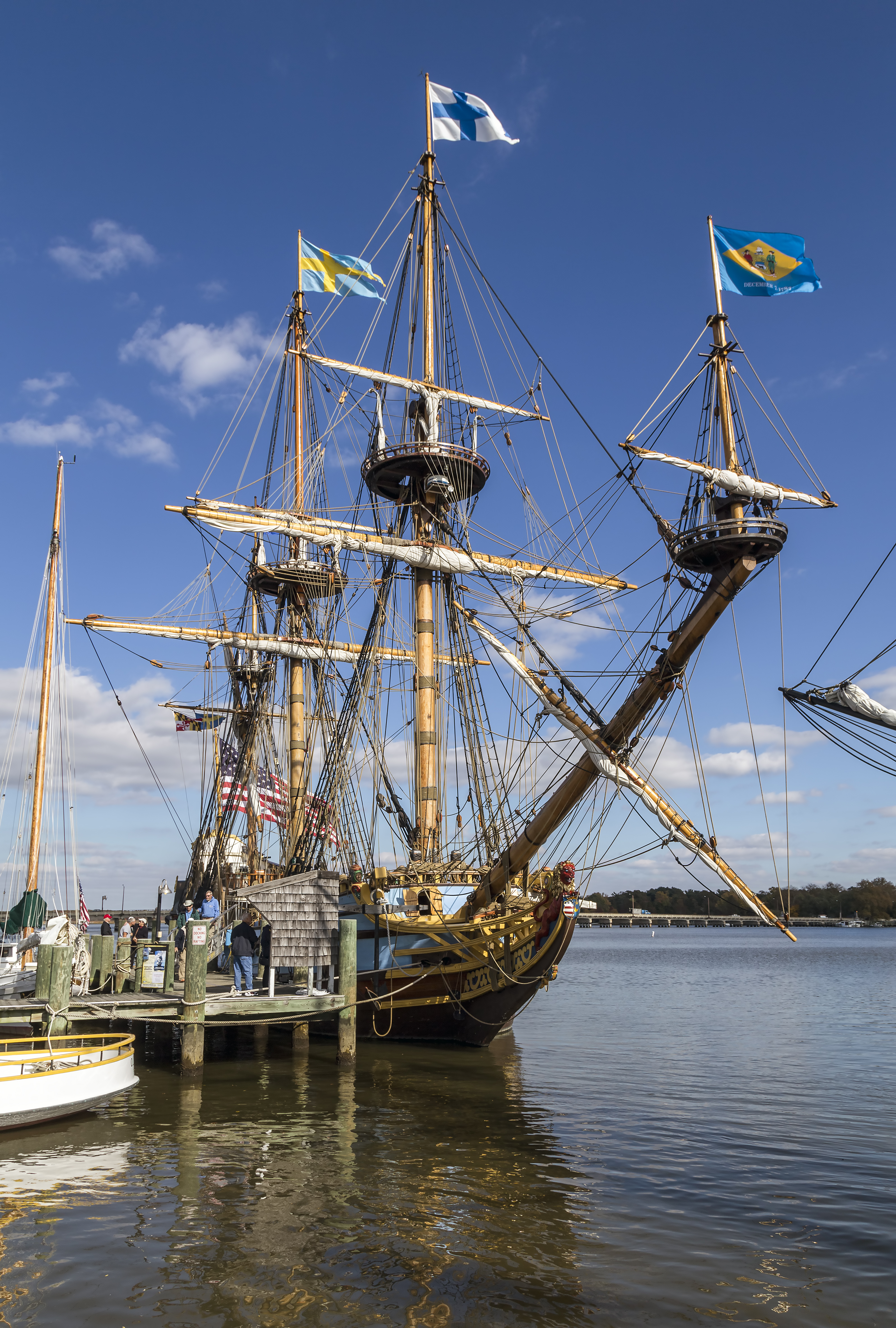
Kalmar Nyckel, with the circular tops typical of a ship in the 17th century

A fighting top was an enlarged top with swivel guns, designed to fire down at the deck of enemy ships. They could also hold sailors or marines armed with muskets or rifles; Horatio Nelson was mortally wounded at the Battle of Trafalgar by a sniper firing from a fighting top of the Redoutable.
