= Sun Odyssey 380 =

Sailboat class

Development
- Designer: Marc Lombard; Jean-Marc Piaton; Jeanneau Design Office
- Location: France
- Year: 2021
- Builder: Jeanneau
- Role: Cruiser
- Name: Sun Odyssey 380

Boat
- Displacement: 15,203 lb (6,896 kg)
- Draft: 6.56 ft (2.00 m)

Hull
- Type: monohull
- Construction: fiberglass
- LOA: 38.55 ft (11.75 m)
- LWL: 35.14 ft (10.71 m)
- Beam: 12.34 ft (3.76 m)
- Engine: Yanmar 29 hp (22 kW) diesel engine

Hull appendages
- Keel: fin keel with weighted bulb
- Ballast: 4,416 lb (2,003 kg)
- Rudder: dual spade-type rudders

Rig
- Rig type: Bermuda rig
- I foretriangle height: 45.57 ft (13.89 m)
- J foretriangle base: 13.78 ft (4.20 m)
- P mainsail luff: 44.13 ft (13.45 m)
- E mainsail foot: 14.76 ft (4.50 m)

Sails
- Sailplan: fractional rigged sloop
- Mainsail area: 325.68 sq ft (30.257 m^{2})
- Jib/genoa area: 313.98 sq ft (29.170 m^{2})
- Total sail area: 639.66 sq ft (59.426 m^{2})

The Sun Odyssey 380 is a French sailboat that was designed by Marc Lombard, Jean-Marc Piaton and the Jeanneau Design Office as a cruiser and first built in 2021.

== Production ==
The design has been built by Jeanneau in France, since 2021 and remained in production in 2023.

== Design ==
The Sun Odyssey 380 is a recreational keelboat, built predominantly of fiberglass, with wood trim and a hard chined hull. The hull is solid hand-laid fiberglass, while the deck is resin injected over a balsa core. It has a fractional sloop rig with a Selden mast and no backstay, a reverse stem, a reverse transom with a drop-down tailgate swimming platform, dual internally mounted spade-type rudders controlled by two wheels and a fixed fin keel, optional shoal-draft keel or swing keel. It displaces 15,203 lb (6,896 kg) and carries 4,416 lb (2,003 kg) of cast iron ballast.

A bow thruster, square-topped mainsail and a bowsprit are factory options.

The boat has a draft of 6.56 ft (2.00 m) with the standard keel, 5.25 ft (1.60 m) with the optional shoal draft keel, while the swing keel-equipped version has a draft of 8.83 ft (2.69 m) with the keel extended and 4.17 ft (1.27 m) with it retracted, allowing operation in shallow water.

The boat is fitted with a Japanese Yanmar diesel engine of 29 hp (22 kW) for docking and maneuvering. The fuel tank holds 34 U.S. gallons (130 L; 28 imp gal) and the fresh water tank has a capacity of 87 U.S. gallons (330 L; 72 imp gal).

The design has sleeping accommodation for four to six people, with a double slanted island berth in the bow cabin, a U-shaped settee and a straight settee in the main cabin and one or two aft cabins, each with a double berth. If the second aft cabin is omitted the space is used for storage instead. The galley is located on the port side just forward of the companionway ladder. The galley is L-shaped and is equipped with a two-burner stove, an ice box and a double sink. A navigation station is opposite the galley, on the starboard side. One or two heads may be fitted, one in the bow cabin on the port side and one on the starboard side aft.

For sailing downwind and reaching the design may be equipped with a code 0 sail.

== Operational history ==
The boat is supported by an active class club the Jeanneau Owners Network.

In a review for Yacht World, Zuzana Prochazka wrote, "we tested hull #2 and our sail took place in 10-18 knots on the flat waters of Chesapeake Bay – and yes, the wind was that fluky. The boat was equipped with Technique Voile sails and a shoal keel which was ideal for the Bay which is filled with skinny water surprises. At 60 degrees AWA, we reached 8.7 knots in 17 knots of breeze without a reef. You'd be hard pressed to make that speed in most boats with 20 more feet of waterline. More importantly, the boat never felt overpowered or uncomfortable. Hardening up to 30 degrees, we still made good 7.9 knots of speed in the same wind with the traditional hoist semi-battened mainsail. There's an option for in-mast furling and a self-tacking jib but we enjoyed the performance of our 110% genoa on a Facnor furler."

A 2021 review by George Day for Bluewater Sailing concluded, "a couple or a family of four will be quite comfortable living boat the SO 380 for extended cruises. Such comfort combined with the boat’s great sailing performance will make it an amazing platform for building family memories."

In a 2022 Cruising World review, Mark Pillsbury wrote, "first impressions count, and mine were definitely favorable as I approached the Jeanneau Sun Odyssey 380 with CW's Boat of the Year judges during October's United States Sailboat Show in Annapolis, Maryland. Something about the way the reverse bow’s knuckle hovered just above the water caught my eye. Toss in pronounced hull chines carried aft from amidships, a low-slung coachroof and a high-aspect rig, and this boat hinted at the potential for some serious giddyap-and-go."

== See also ==
- List of sailing boat types
