= Accommodation ladder =

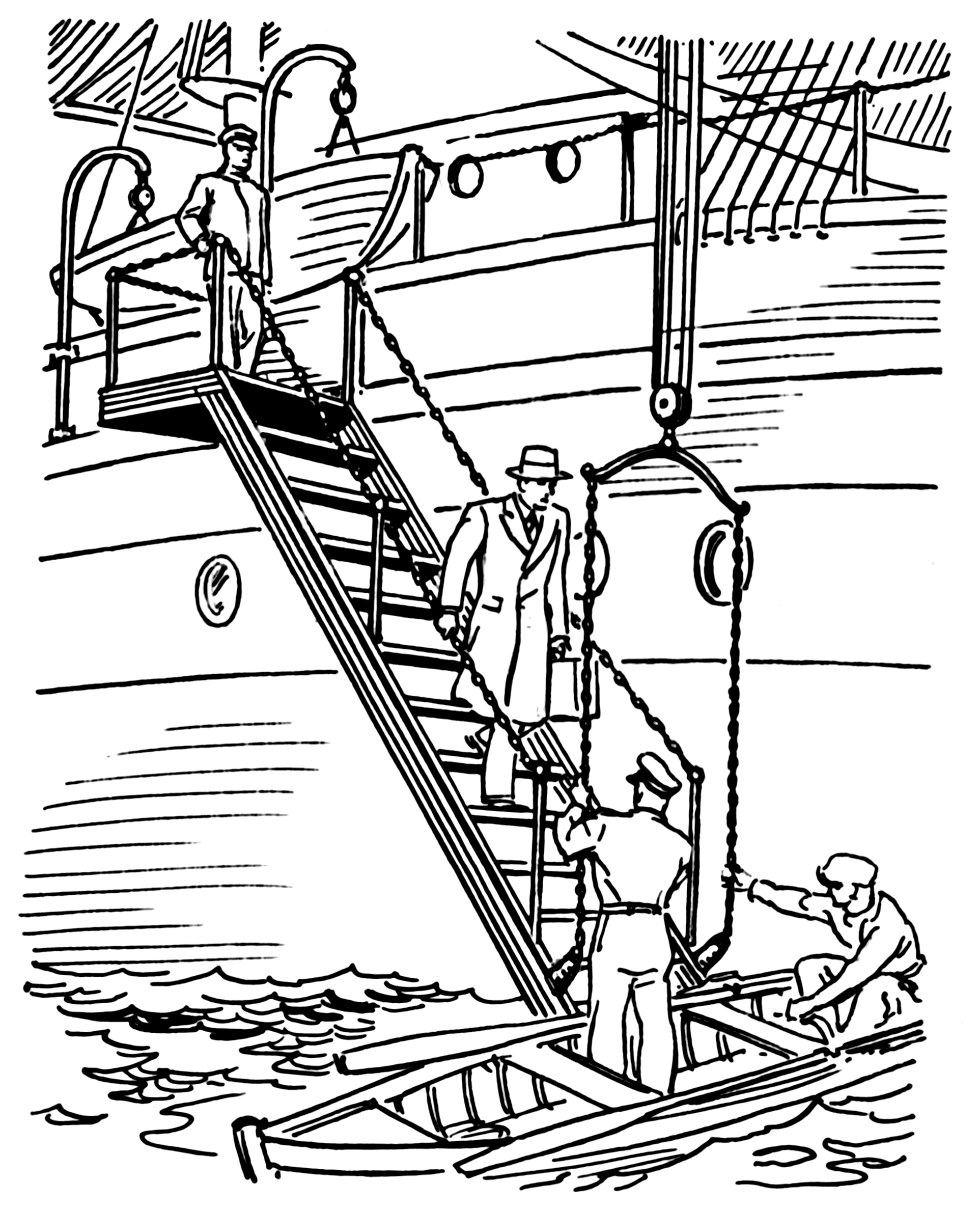
An illustration of a ship's accommodation ladder by Pearson Scott Foresman

An accommodation ladder is a foldable flight of steps down a ship's side.

Accommodation ladders can be mounted parallel or perpendicular to the ship's board. If the ladder is parallel to the ship, it has to have an upper platform. Upper platforms are mostly turnable. The lower platform (or the ladder itself) hangs on a bail and can be lifted as required.

To prevent damage to boats going under the ladder as the water level rises and falls, a boat fender is fitted to the end of the ladder.

The ladder has handrails on both sides for safety. Accommodation ladders are constructed in such a way that the steps are horizontal whatever the angle of inclination of the ladder. The lower end the ladder/lower platform is based on a roll to compensate for the motion of the ship in relation to the quay.

== See also ==
- Jacob's ladder (nautical)
- Pilot ladder
