= Maritime pilot =

Mariner who maneuvers ships through dangerous or congested waters

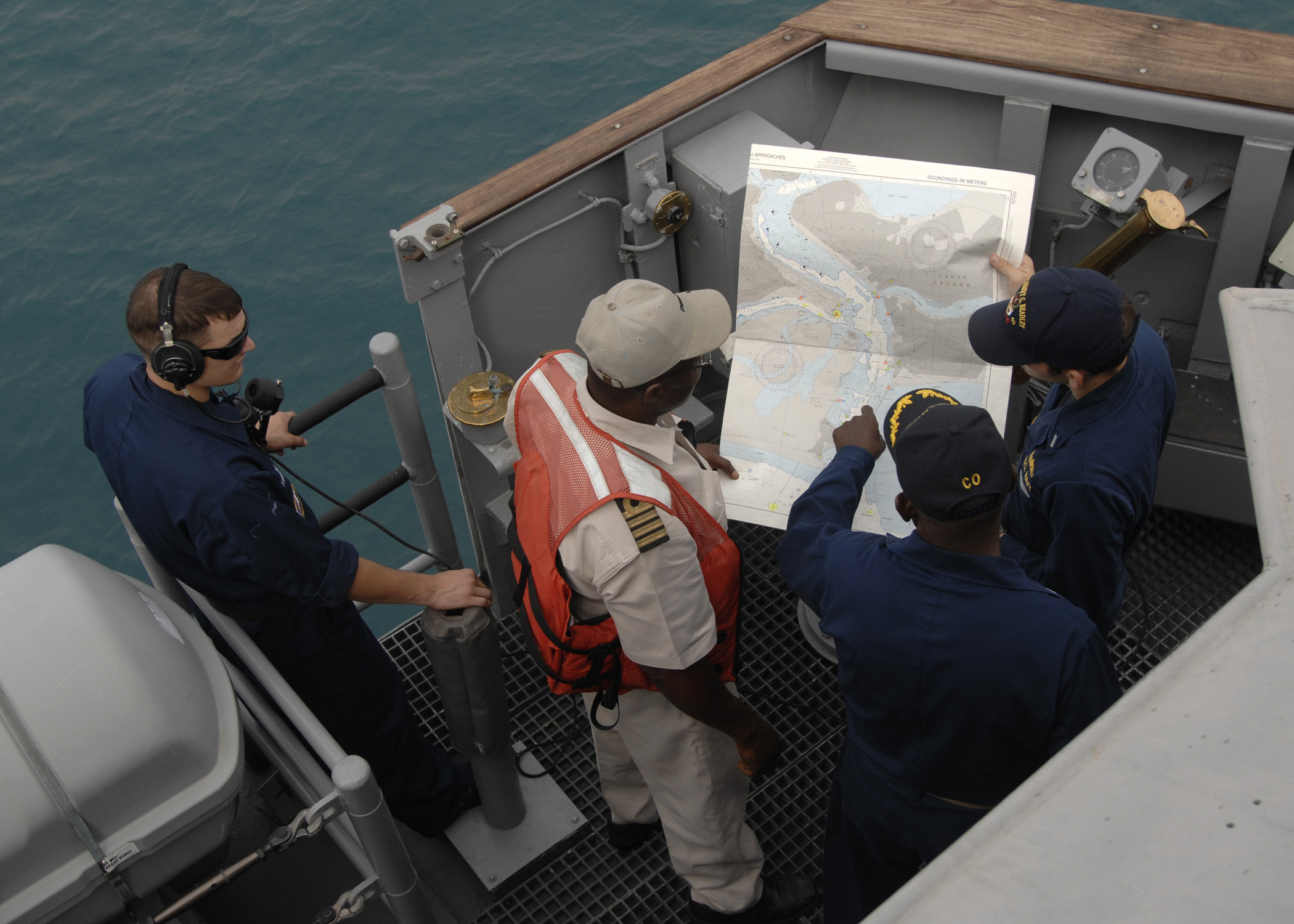
A Nigerian pilot assists a U.S. Navy ship into the harbor at Lagos using nautical charts

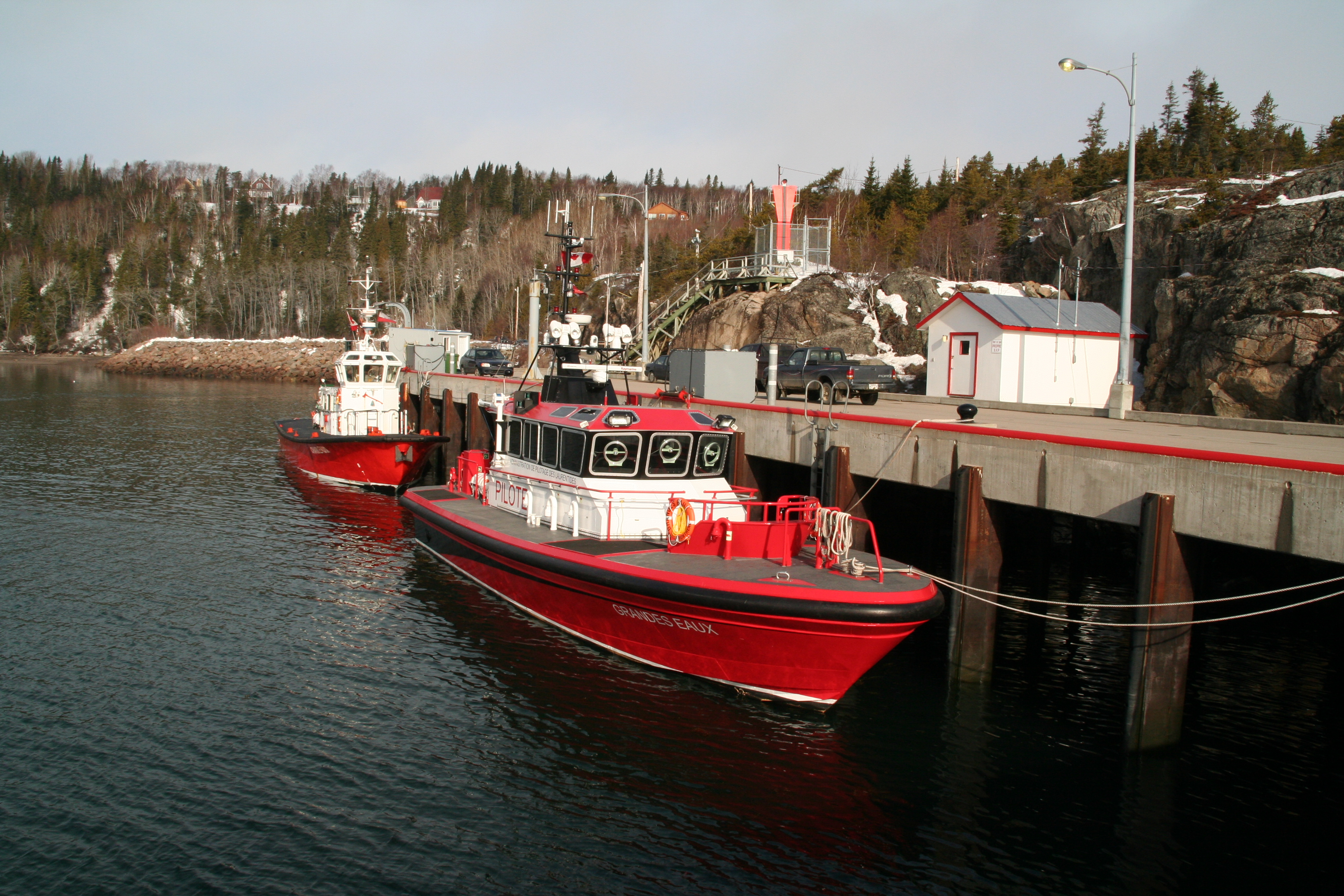
Grandes Eaux, pilot vessels Anse-aux-Basques, Les Escoumins, maritime estuary of St. Lawrence, Canada

A maritime pilot (also known as marine pilot, harbor pilot, port pilot, and ship pilot), or simply pilot, is a mariner who has specific knowledge of an often dangerous or congested waterway, such as harbors or river mouths. Maritime pilots know local details such as depth, currents, and hazards. They board and temporarily join the crew to safely guide the ship's passage, so they must also have expertise in handling ships of all types and sizes. Obtaining the title "maritime pilot" requires being licensed or authorised by a recognised pilotage authority.

== History ==
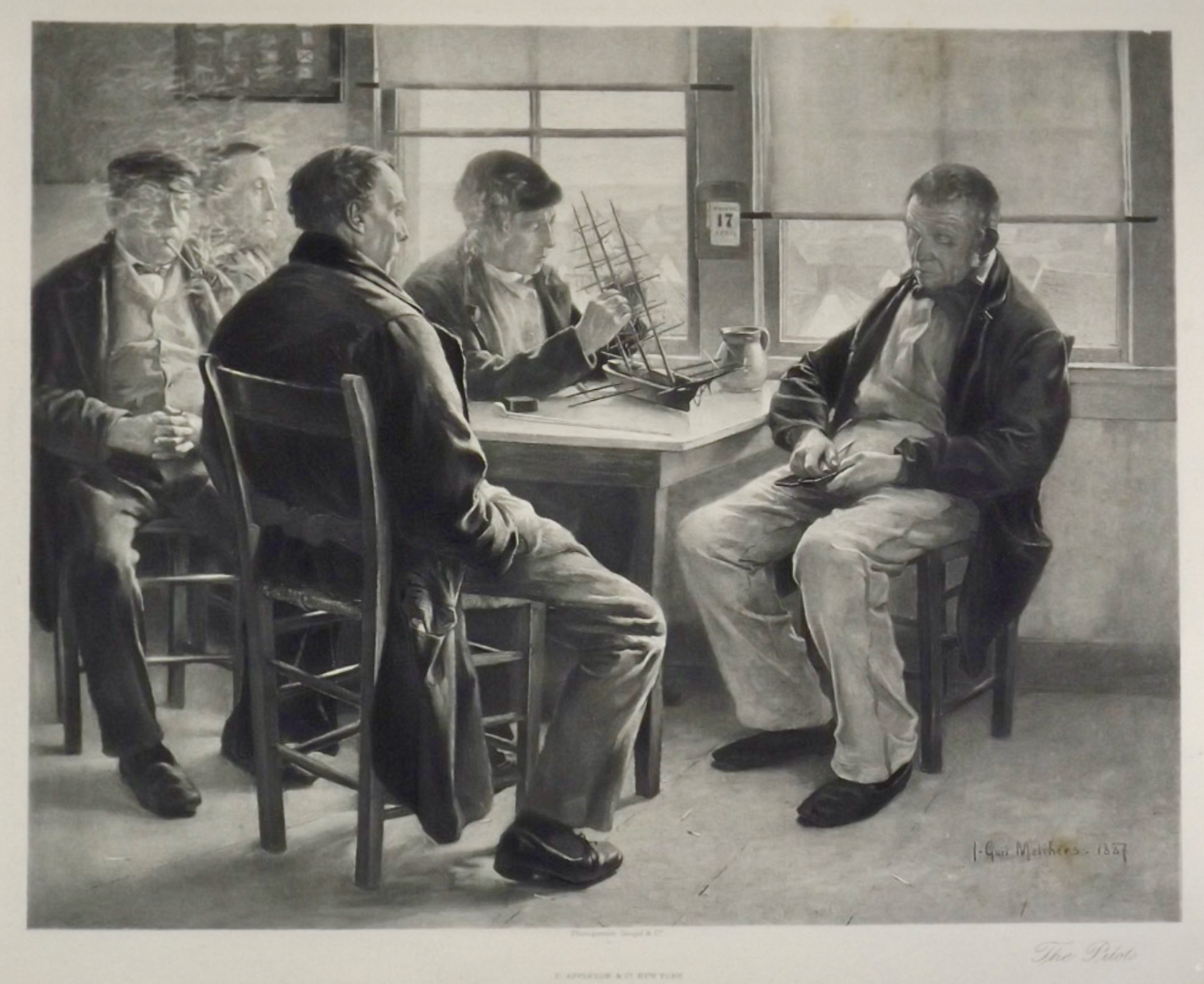
Five pilots sitting around a wooden table.

The word pilot is believed to have come from the Middle French, pilot, pillot, from Italian, pilota, from Late Latin, pillottus; ultimately from Ancient Greek πηδόν (pēdón, "blade of an oar, oar").

The work functions of the pilot can be traced back to Ancient Greece and Rome, when locally experienced harbour captains, mainly local fishermen, were employed by incoming ships' captains to bring their trading vessels into port safely.

The pilot boat was made to quickly reach incoming ships from port. Harbor masters began to require licensing and insured pilots and placed regulations on incoming ships to bring pilots aboard.

Inland waterway trade also relies on the work of pilots known as trip pilots. Due to the shortage of qualified posted masters, these independent contractors fill the holes in the manning schedule on inland push boats on various inland river routes.

A Sandy Hook pilot is a licensed maritime pilot for the Port of New York and New Jersey, the Hudson River, and Long Island Sound. Sandy Hook pilots have been piloting ships in the New York Harbor for over 300 years. The pilots of New York and Boston first served on Square rigs before entering the pilot service as boat keepers, later receiving their warrants as pilots, then their full commissions as branch pilots authorized to pilot vessels of any draught size.

== Duties involved ==
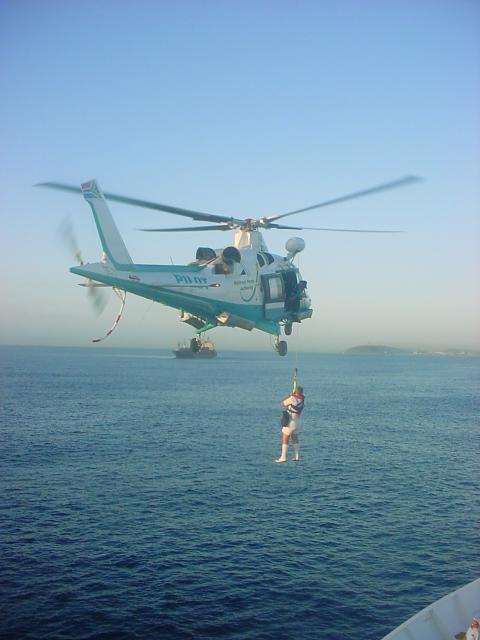
A pilot preparing to board a vessel by helicopter outside Durban Harbour in South Africa

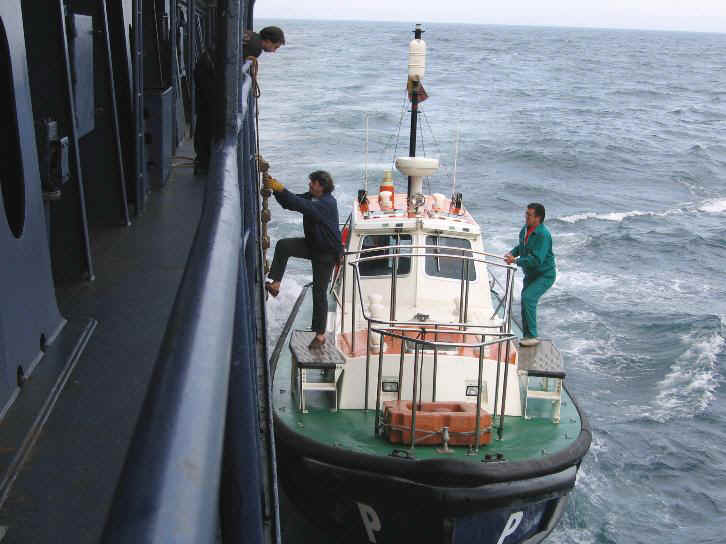
A pilot boarding a ship from a pilot boat while underway

In English law, by section 742 of the Merchant Shipping Act 1894 (57 & 58 Vict. c. 60), a pilot is defined as "any person not belonging to a ship who has the conduct thereof"—someone other than a member of the crew who has control over the speed, direction, and movement of the ship. The Pilotage Act 1987 governs the management of maritime pilots and pilotage in harbors in the United Kingdom.

Pilots are required to have maritime experience prior to becoming a pilot, including local knowledge of the area. For example, the California Board of Pilot Commissioners requires that pilot trainees have a master's license, two years' command experience on tugs or deep draft vessels, and pass a written exam and simulator exercise, followed by a period of up to three years' training, gaining experience with different types of vessel and docking facilities. Following licensing, pilots are required to engage in continuing educational programs.

Typically, the pilot joins an incoming ship prior to the ship's entry into the shallow water at the designated "pilot boarding area" via helicopter or pilot boat and climbs a pilot ladder, sometimes up to 40 feet (12 metres), to the deck of the largest container and tanker ships. Before climbing the pilot ladder, the pilot performs a visual inspection of the boarding arrangement to confirm it is safe to use and in accordance with international requirements.

As both the ship to be piloted and the pilot's own vessel are usually moving this may be dangerous, especially in rough seas. With outgoing vessels, a pilot boat returns the pilot to land after the ship has successfully negotiated coastal waters. Pilots are required by law in most major sea ports of the world for large ships. Pilots use pilotage techniques that rely on nearby visual reference points and local knowledge of tides, swells, currents, depths and shoals that might not be readily identifiable on nautical charts without firsthand experience in certain waters.

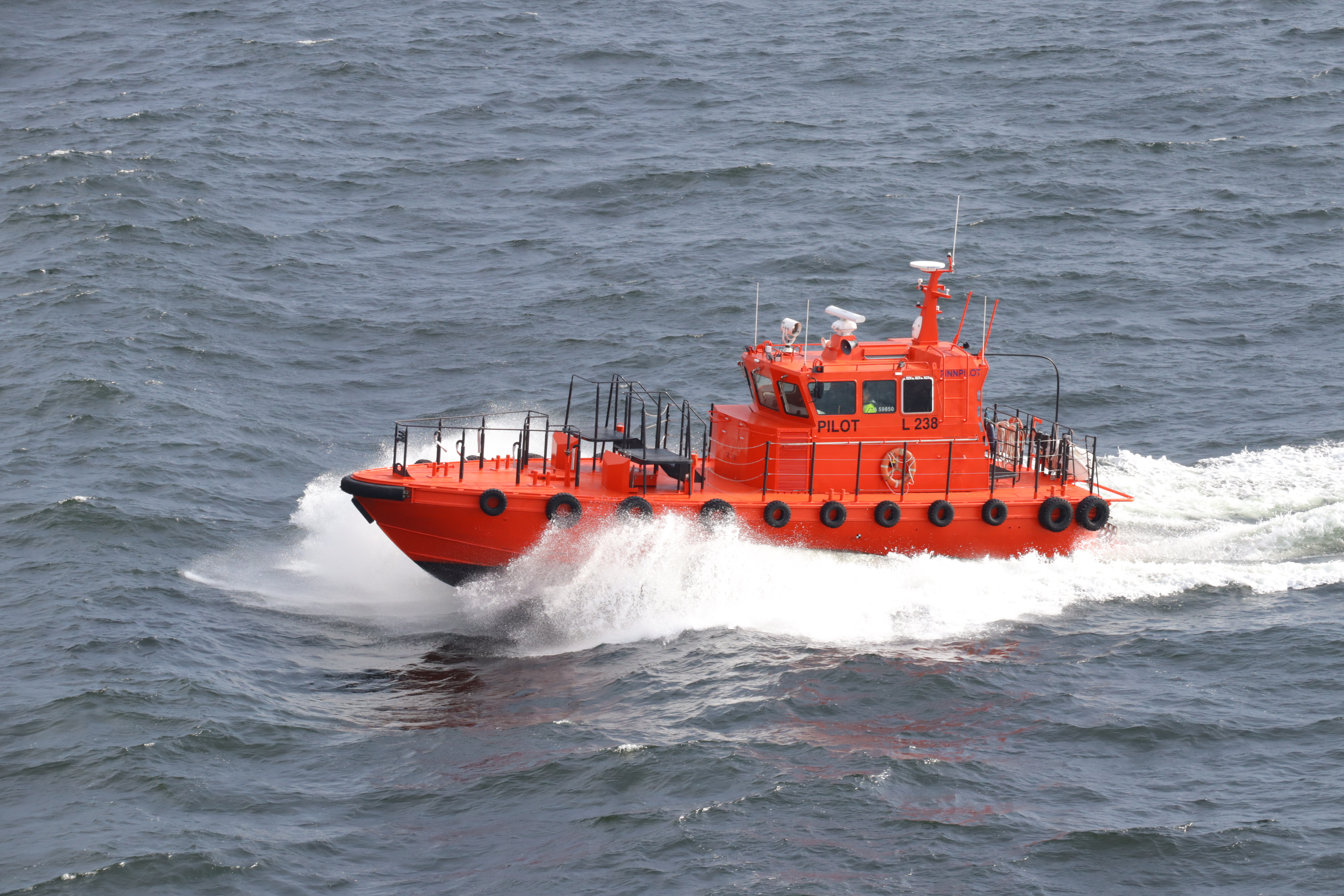
A Finnish pilot boat of Finnpilot off the coast of Helsinki

Legally, the master has full responsibility for the safe navigation of their vessel, even when a pilot is on board. If they have clear grounds that the pilot may jeopardize the safety of navigation, they can relieve the pilot from their duties and ask for another pilot, or, if not required to have a pilot on board, navigate the vessel without one. In every case, during the time passed aboard for operation, the pilot will remain under the master's authority, and always out of the "ship's command chain." The pilot remains aboard as an important and indispensable part of the bridge team. Only in transit of the Panama Canal does the pilot have full responsibility for the navigation of the vessel.

In some countries, deck officers of vessels who have strong local knowledge and experience of navigating in those ports, such as a ferry or regular trader, may be issued with a pilotage exemption certificate, which relieves them of the need to take a pilot on board.

== Remote pilotage ==
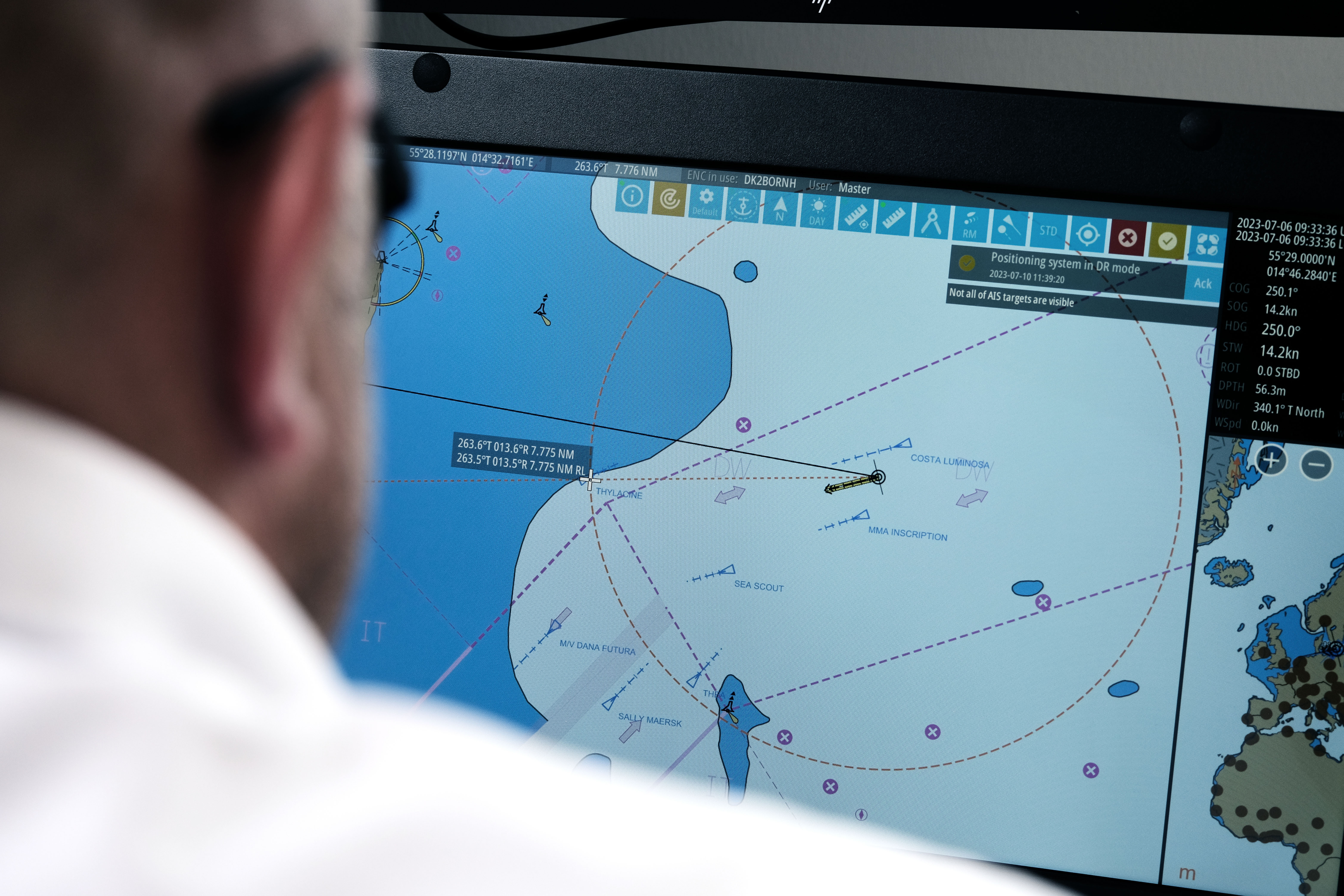
A remote maritime pilot at DanPilot's operations center monitors live navigational data and radar feeds during Denmark's remote pilotage test program. The system enables pilots to guide vessels without boarding, using real-time sensor input.

In 2024, Denmark launched a pioneering initiative to explore the use of remote pilotage, marking a global first in the maritime industry. The program, overseen by national pilotage authority DanPilot in cooperation with maritime technology provider Danelec, allows pilots to guide vessels from a shore-based control center using real-time data.

The system transmits navigational information, radar feeds and sensor data from the vessel to a remote operations hub, enabling pilots to perform their duties without physically boarding the ship. This setup is currently being tested in the Western Baltic Sea, an area known for its traffic complexity and narrow transit routes.

The objective is to assess whether remote pilotage can offer a safe and effective alternative in specific scenarios, such as short transits or adverse weather, while maintaining the high safety standards required in traditional pilotage. The project has attracted international attention as a potential advancement in port efficiency, environmental sustainability, and pilot safety.

== Compensation ==
The Florida Alliance of Maritime Organizations reported in 2010 that Florida pilots' annual salaries range from US$100,000 to US$400,000, on par with other US states that have large ports. (Note: US$100,000 in 2010 is equivalent to $148,000 in 2025, while US$400,000 in 2010 is equivalent to $591,000 in 2025, according to calculations based on the consumer price index measure of inflation.) Columbia River Bar Pilots earn approximately US$180,000 per year. (Note: US$180,000 in 2004 is equivalent to $307,000 in 2025, while US$180,000 in 2009 is equivalent to $270,000 in 2025, according to calculations based on the consumer price index measure of inflation. The 2009 updated version of the article does not make clear whether the figure of $180,000 relates to 2004 or 2009. Hence, why both figures are shown here in this note.) A 2008 review of pilot salaries in the United States showed that pay ranged from about US$250,000 to over US$500,000 per year. (Note: US$250,000 in 2008 is equivalent to $374,000 in 2025, while US$500,000 in 2008 is equivalent to $748,000 in 2025, according to calculations based on the consumer price index measure of inflation.) The Sandy Hook Pilots Association in Staten Island, New York, has 50 employees across its locations and generates $7.15 million in sales (USD).

Pilot compensation has been controversial in many ports, including the ports of Los Angeles and Long Beach, California, especially in regard to pilots who are employed by public agencies instead of acting as independent contractors. As at 2011, Los Angeles pilots received $374,000 a year. (Note: US$374,000 in 2011 is equivalent to $535,000 in 2025, according to calculations based on the consumer price index measure of inflation.)

Compensation varies in other nations. In New Zealand, according to the government career service, as at 2006, pilots earn NZ$90,000-120,000. (Note: NZ$90,000 in 2006 is equivalent to $148,000 in 2026, while NZ$120,000 in 2006 is equivalent to $197,000 in 2026, according to calculations based on the New Zealand consumer price index measure of inflation.)

== Gallery ==
Signal flag H (Hotel) is used to signal "Pilot on board"

Signal flag G (Golf) is used to signal "I require a pilot"

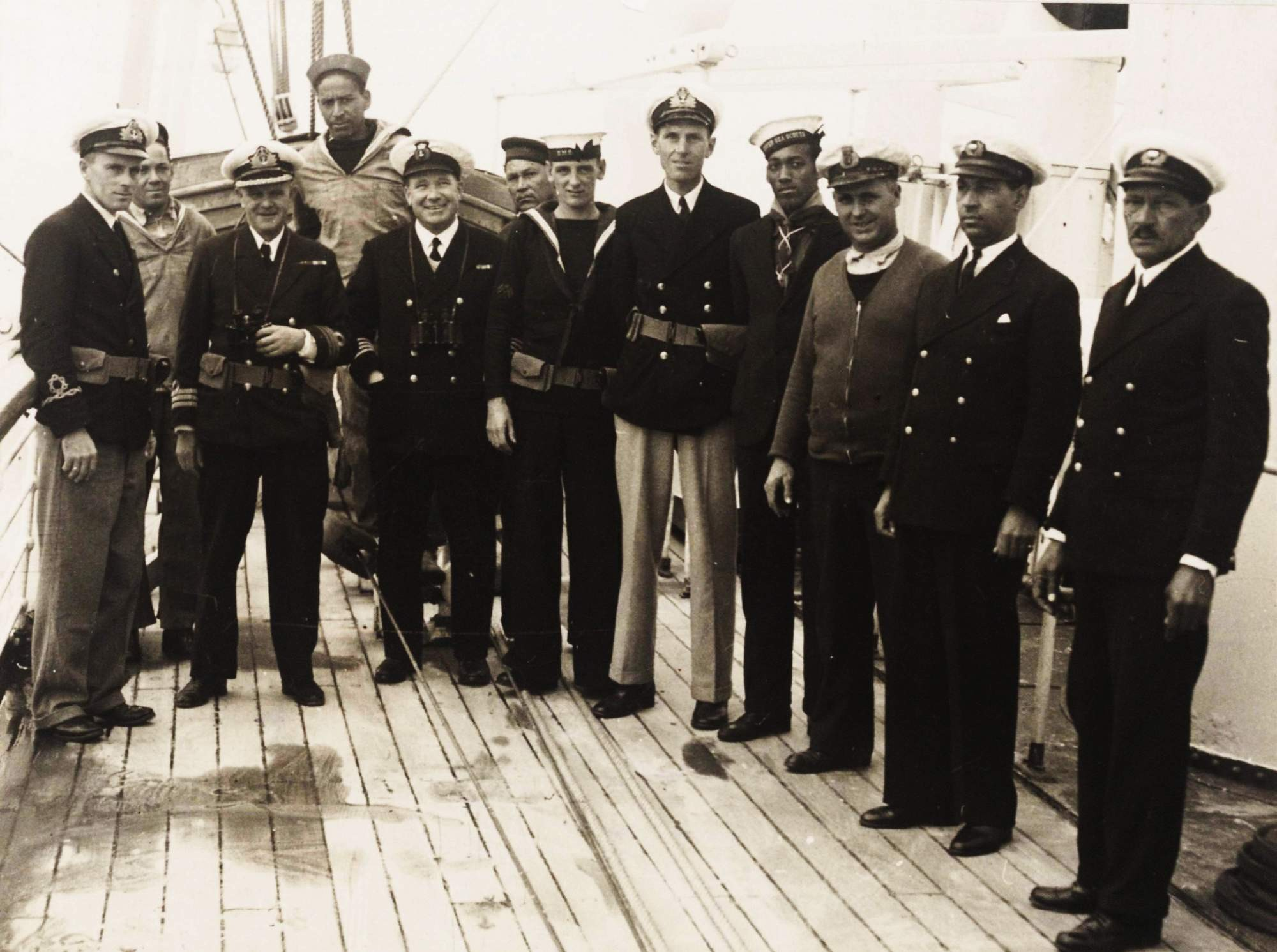
Crew, including two Government Pilots at right, of Royal Naval Examination Service vessel HMS Castle Harbour at the British Imperial fortress colony of Bermuda during the Second World War. The vessel delivered a naval examiner and pilot to arriving ships, respectively to clear them for entry and to steer to harbour.

== See also ==
- Navigator
- Pilot boat
- Pilot station
