= Tarring (rope) =

Coating fibers with pine tar or coal tar

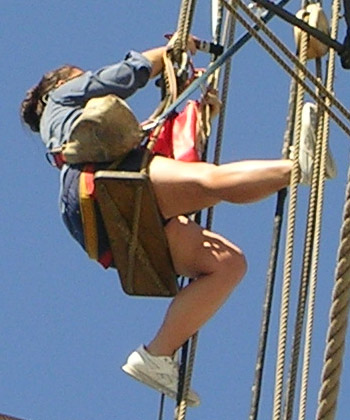
Tarring rope aloft in the rigging of a sailing ship

Tarring is the protecting of some types of natural fibre and wire rope by coating it with tar. Hemp rope, which was typically used for standing rigging, requires tarring. Manila and cotton ropes were used for running rigging and were not tarred as this would make the rope too stiff to run easily through blocks. Regular tarring at sea was required when sailing ships used hemp rope - once every 6 months for a ship on a long voyage.

== Application ==
Hemp rope is treated with Stockholm tar, sometimes mixed with coal tar. Most is applied in situ (commonly while the ship is at sea); some parts of the rigging may be slacked off, or upper masts may be sent down to improve access. To access stays and backstays, a seaman is lowered slowly down the stay on a gantline (Note: A rope that runs through a block at, or near the masthead. It is used solely for hoisting men or tools, as opposed to the other running rigging which hoists sails or spars.) that is fastened loosely to the stay with a bowline. The seaman applies the tar from a bucket as he goes down. The gantline is tended by someone on deck. The shrouds can be tarred from the ratlines, sometimes combined with fitting new ratlines or re-seizing the existing ones. Lee rigging is typically worked on underway, as drips or spilt tar usually fall into the sea rather than on deck.

=== Steps ===
The process of protecting wire rope standing rigging is described in the book Star of India, The Log of an Iron Ship - Page 116, Footnote 3

To protect wire rigging from moisture and resultant rusting, it first is "wormed" by laying small line in the spiral grooves between the strands, to make a smoother surface. It then is "parceled" by wrapping in the same direction with long strips of cotton duck (burlap if you're poor) and finally it is "served" by wrapping it in the opposite direction with hambroline, a three-stranded tarred hemp cord, a little smaller in diameter than a lead pencil. Finally it is well treated with Stockholm tar.

== Historic manufacture of tarred rigging ==
"The use of tarred rigging is now of less interest to seafaring man than formerly because of the rapid and extensive development of steam power. However, tarred rigging is used today on craft of various types to such an extent that the production of tarred goods is an important branch of the cordage industry. The tar best suited for cordage comes from various members of the pine tree family and is obtained by the distillation process, either by using the old kiln or by modern retorts. It is conceded that the kiln-made article is superior for tarred rigging and therefore it is used principally in making first-quality tarred rope. The tar, as it comes from the kiln, is poured into barrels which are shipped to the cordage works. The way this tar is handled and how it is made to penetrate and adhere to the yarn, as is done by the Plymouth Cordage Company, North Plymouth, Mass., may be described as follows:

"The tar is heated to 200 degrees or more in tanks from which the liquid feeds into long copper-lined troughs, where the tarring takes place. Through these "coppers," so called, run steam pipes to further regulate the temperature. Excessive heating would cause the loss of the tar's good qualities, and to prevent this the supply in the "coppers" must be freshened frequently. As the yarns, heavily saturated with tar, come from the "copper" they are compressed between two rollers, adjusted to leave in the yarn as much or as little tar as needed for the particular goods being made and to turn back the surplus. The pull which carries the yarn through the tar and between the rollers comes from two large drums, around which the yarns travel preparatory to reeling on to the friction-driven receiving bobbins. Goods of nine-thread size and under are usually tarred in the completed rope form, but the process is essentially the same as with the yarns. The rich golden brown color of the tarred goods—an outward sign of right materials and methods—has become recognized as the Plymouth mark of the weather-resisting qualities contained in the goods."

== See also ==
- Pine tar
- Rigging
- Worm, parcel and serve
