= Footrope =

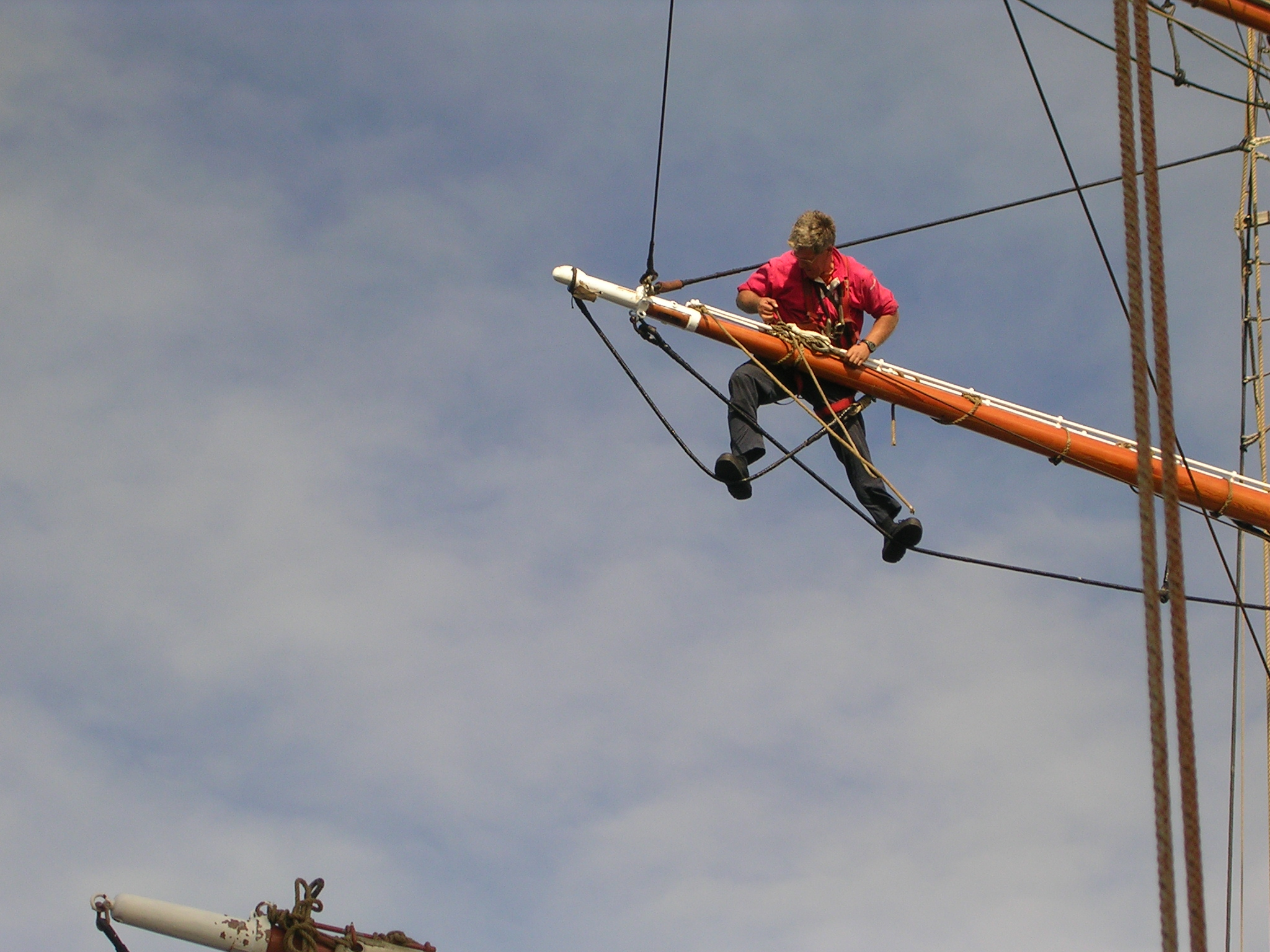
Sailor standing on a footrope, outer foot on the Flemish horse.

The footrope (lightly outlined in red) on the topgallant yard, far above the water. See also the picture at Flemish horse (rigging)

A footrope is a rope suspended underneath a yard or bowsprit for sailors to stand on while working on the sails. It is a feature of square rigged sailing vessels from the middle of the 17th century onwards. Before its invention, sailors would lie or sit on the yards to stow or loose sails.

The footrope is supported along the middle of its span by stirrups, short pieces of rope which are seized to the jackstay on the yard and hang down on the after side. The footrope is either fed through the thimble at the lower end of the stirrup, or seized to it.

The Flemish horse is an extra piece of footrope provided at the end of the yard, hanging in a single bight. It covers the region where the main footrope is rising up towards its attachment point on the yard and is therefore too close to the yard for effective use.

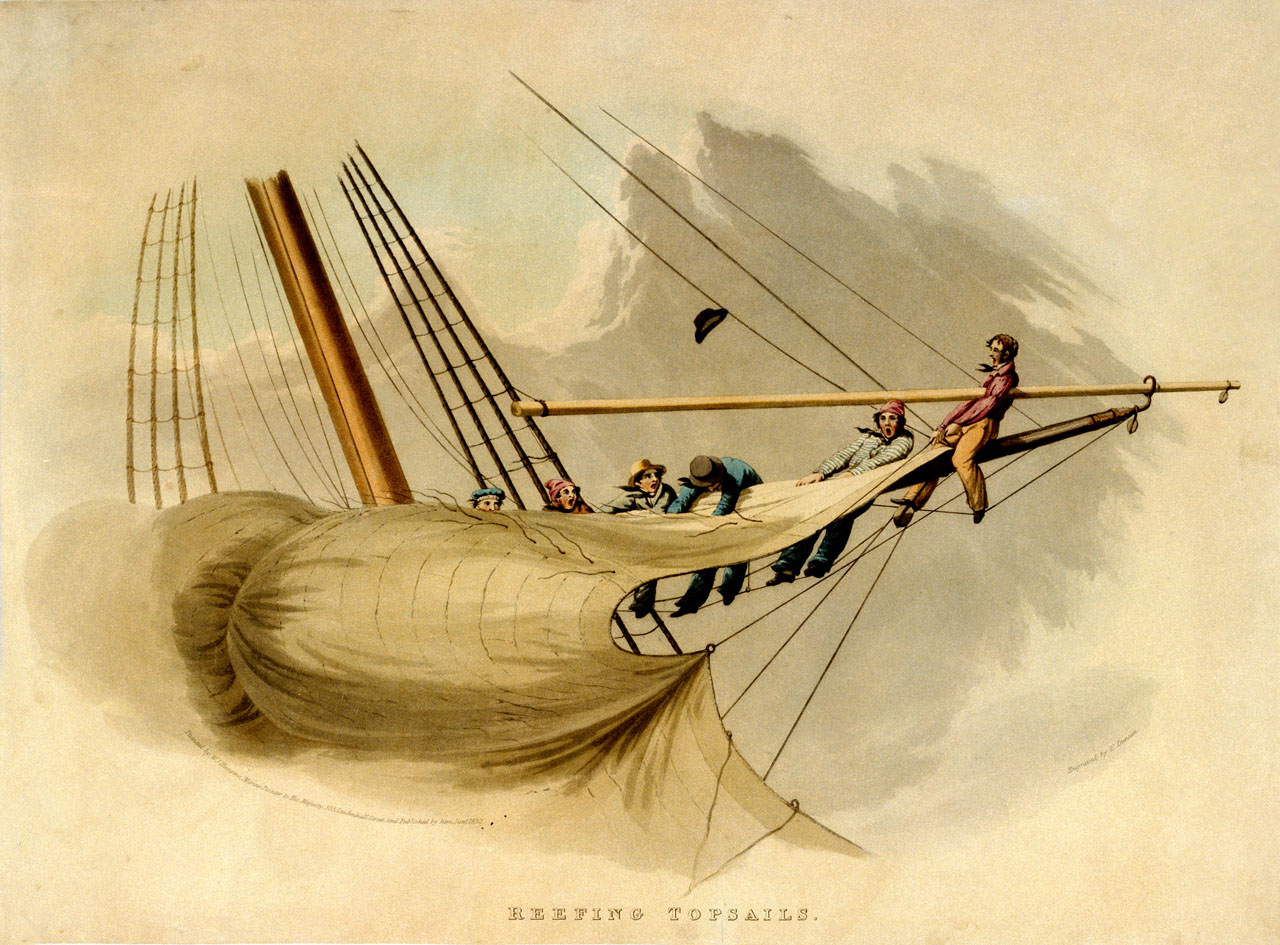
This caricature of reefing a topsail, by W J Huggins demonstrates work aloft. The studding sail boom has been lifted out of the way to allow room to work. The man at the end of the yard is astride the yard and has his feet on the flemish horse.

Another nautical use of the term footrope is for the boltrope sewn along the foot of a sail to provide reinforcement.

== History ==
Square rig has had different versions at various points in history. Originally, all yards, including the lower yard, were hoisted every time a sail was set, and lowered when it was handed. Square sails were not reefed over the period c. 1350–1660. (Note: It is not clear if sails were reefed before this period. The earliest surviving archaeological evidence of reef-points is on the sails for the ship's boat associated with Vasa. The rarity of such survivals tells us nothing about any earlier usage.) Instead, the courses had extra canvas, called a bonnet, which was added to the sail in lighter winds, and removal was the equivalent of reefing. Topsails and topgallants were partially lowered in stronger winds to reduce their drive – a process termed "half-masting". This system was worked without footropes, with sailors lying or sitting on the yards to stow or loose sails. Some of the work of stowing sails could be done from the tops.

Early in the seventeenth century, topmasts became better supported; backstays began to be used from c. 1611. As a consequence, topsails started to become the main working sail of square rig: the first to be set and the last to be handed. Previously, the courses had that role, with topsails simply providing extra sail area in lighter winds. In order to provide a sheeting point for the topsail, lower yards were left in their hoisted position. The brailing system in use changed in the seventeenth century, with the martnet being replaced by leechlines. These developments increased the amount of work that needed to be done aloft and changed its nature. The footrope was invented c. 1650 to cope with this. Reefing of topsails was introduced c. 1655, giving another task for which footropes were useful.

The mid-seventeenth century introduction of footropes reduced the need for the tops to be quite so large, as some of the work of handing or setting sails now moved out on to the yards.

== Description ==
Although square sails are mostly worked from the deck, in order to be reefed or properly stowed (and released from this stowage) they must be folded by hand and tied to the yard with gaskets. This requires sailors to go aloft, during which time they stand on the footropes. The ropes are made of either fibre or wire, and are almost always protected from wear by being wormed, parcelled and served, so that the visible outer coating is of tarred thin line. They are attached to the yard via the jackstays or "handrails" to which the sails are also fastened, tied on with many turns of thin line. The inner parts of the footrope are held up towards the yard by vertical lines called stirrups; one of these is visible in the picture on the right. Also visible is the flemish horse that the outermost sailor stands on; because this yard is quite small the flemish horse actually extends fairly close to the centre.

Sailors get onto the footropes from the ratlines up the mast. Lower down, where everything is bigger, there may be a small length of footrope bridging the gap between ratlines and yard; this is especially necessary on the windward side when the yards are braced hard round, as the gap becomes quite large. Because the yard must be free to move, this footrope is rather loose and hence unstable. Higher up the gap is small enough to step across, though it may be a stretch when hard-braced. Since the footrope will react to the extra weight placed on it, the practice on some ships is to call "stepping on port" (or starboard) before getting on, to warn those already using it.

Once on the yard, modern sailors are able to clip their harnesses onto a safety wire that runs along it (on most ships they will have been unsecured until this point) - in the past, crews enjoyed no such protection. The sailors will now edge out along the footrope until they are spread evenly along the yard. Leaning forwards over the yard helps with balancing on the footrope, but where the buntlines come down to the yard it is necessary to lean back or crouch down to get around them. The outermost member of the crew must step off the footrope (calling "stepping off starboard" (or port) if that is the practice) across a small gap onto the flemish horse in order to reach the end of the yard where the clew of the sail is to be hauled up or let go.

Because the footrope provides a rather narrow area to stand on, it can cause sore feet after a while. Modern sailors joining a tall ship are advised to take footwear with a solid sole that will spread the load, rather than the flexible deck shoes and seaboots used on yachts.

== See also ==
- Ratlines

== Bibliography ==
- Anderson, Roger C. (1994) [1927]. The rigging of ships in the days of the spritsail topmast: 1600–1720 (reprint ed.). New York: Dover Publications. ISBN 978-0486279602.
- Burningham, Nick (April 2001). "Learning to sail the Duyfken replica". International Journal of Nautical Archaeology. 30 (1): 74–85. Bibcode:2001IJNAr..30...74B. doi:10.1111/j.1095-9270.2001.tb01357.x.
- Harland, John (2015). Seamanship in the age of sail : an account of shiphandling of the sailing man-o-war, 1600-1860. London. ISBN 978-1-8448-6309-9.
- Hocker, Fred (2023). Hocker, Fred (ed.). Vasa. II Part 1: Rigging and sailing a Swedish warship of 1628 The material remains and archaeological context. Stockholm : Lund: Vasamuseet; Nordic Academic Press. ISBN 9789188909114.
  - Bartos, Louis; Bengtsson, Sven; Svensson, Sam; Hocker, Fred (2023). "Sails". In Hocker, Fred (ed.). Vasa. II Part 1: Rigging and sailing a Swedish warship of 1628 The material remains and archaeological context. Stockholm : Lund: Vasamuseet; Nordic Academic Press. ISBN 9789188909114.
- Lees, James (1979). The Masting and Rigging of English Ships of War, 1625-1860. London: Conway Maritime Press. ISBN 0-85177-136-X.
- Narbrough, John (1946) [1672]. Anderson, Roger C (ed.). Journals and Narratives of the Third Dutch War. London: The Navy Records Society.
- Underhill, Harold (1946) [1938]. Masting and Rigging, the Clipper Ship and Ocean Carrier (1958 reprint ed.). Glasgow: Brown, Son and Ferguson, Ltd.
