= Flemish horse (rigging) =

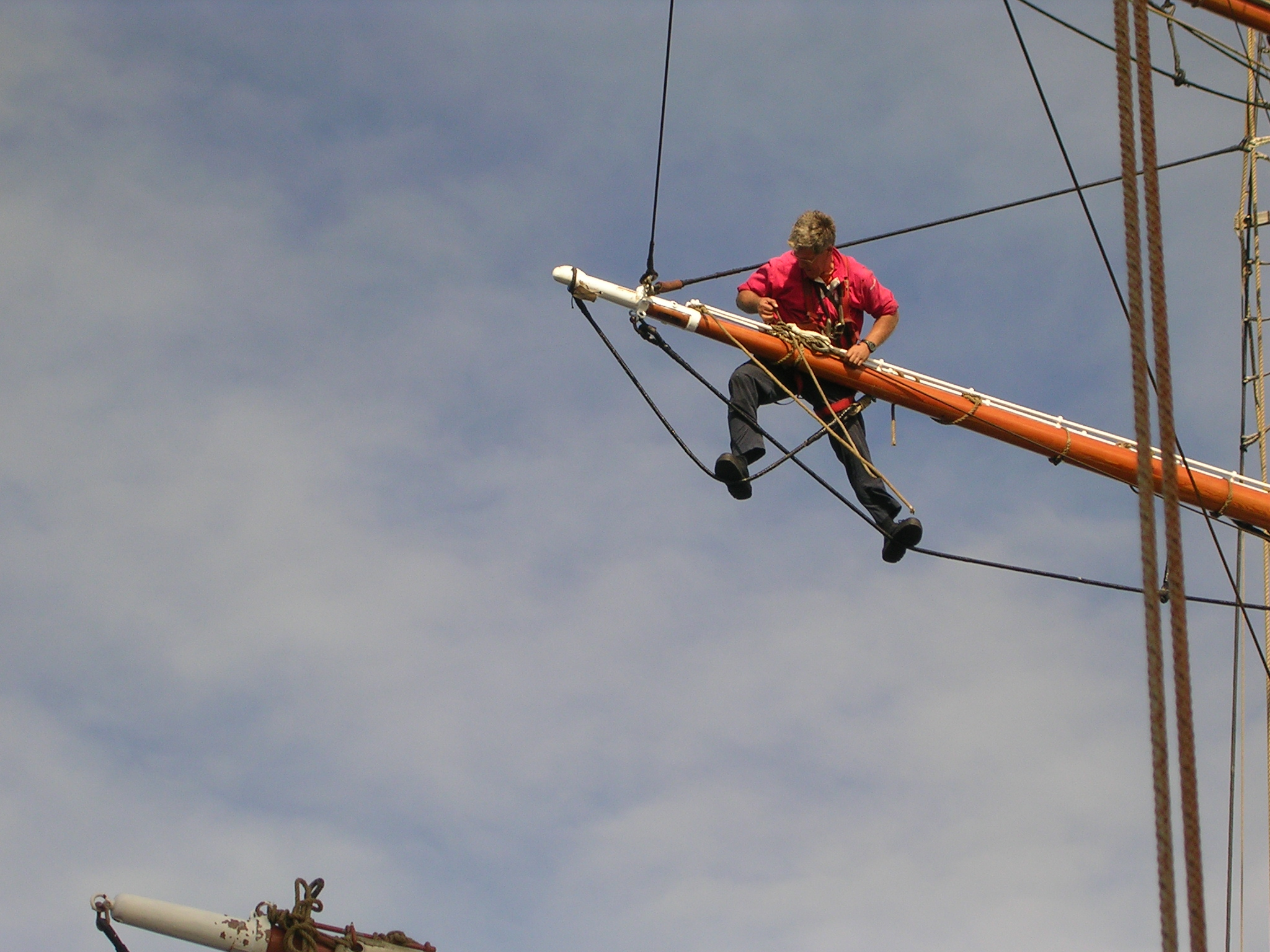
A deckhand standing on both the main footrope and the Flemish horse.

A Flemish horse is a footrope on a square rigged sailing ship that is found at the extreme outer end of the yard, or the yardarm. The main footrope runs along the whole length of the yard, but because of its length the angle upwards to where it is attached is quite shallow, and thus it is too high to stand on for some distance inwards. Sailors on this part of the yard stand on the Flemish horse instead, which being shorter hangs down more and hence is low enough to stand on.

The Flemish horse, being at the outer end of the yard, often made of thinner rope and attached only at its ends, is somewhat unstable compared with the main footrope. This, together with the requirement to step off the main footrope in order to get onto it means that a place on the Flemish horse is generally reserved for the more experienced sailors working on a yard.

The origin of the term is not clear. There is some evidence that at one time all footropes were known as "horses" (e.g., in German, the footrope is to this day called "Fußpferd", i.e. "foot horse"). It has been suggested that Flemish horses (i.e. animals from Flanders in Belgium) were regarded as being more unruly than most, and hence the unstable outer "horse" acquired this name.
