= Jacob's ladder (nautical) =

Various types of rope ladders on ships

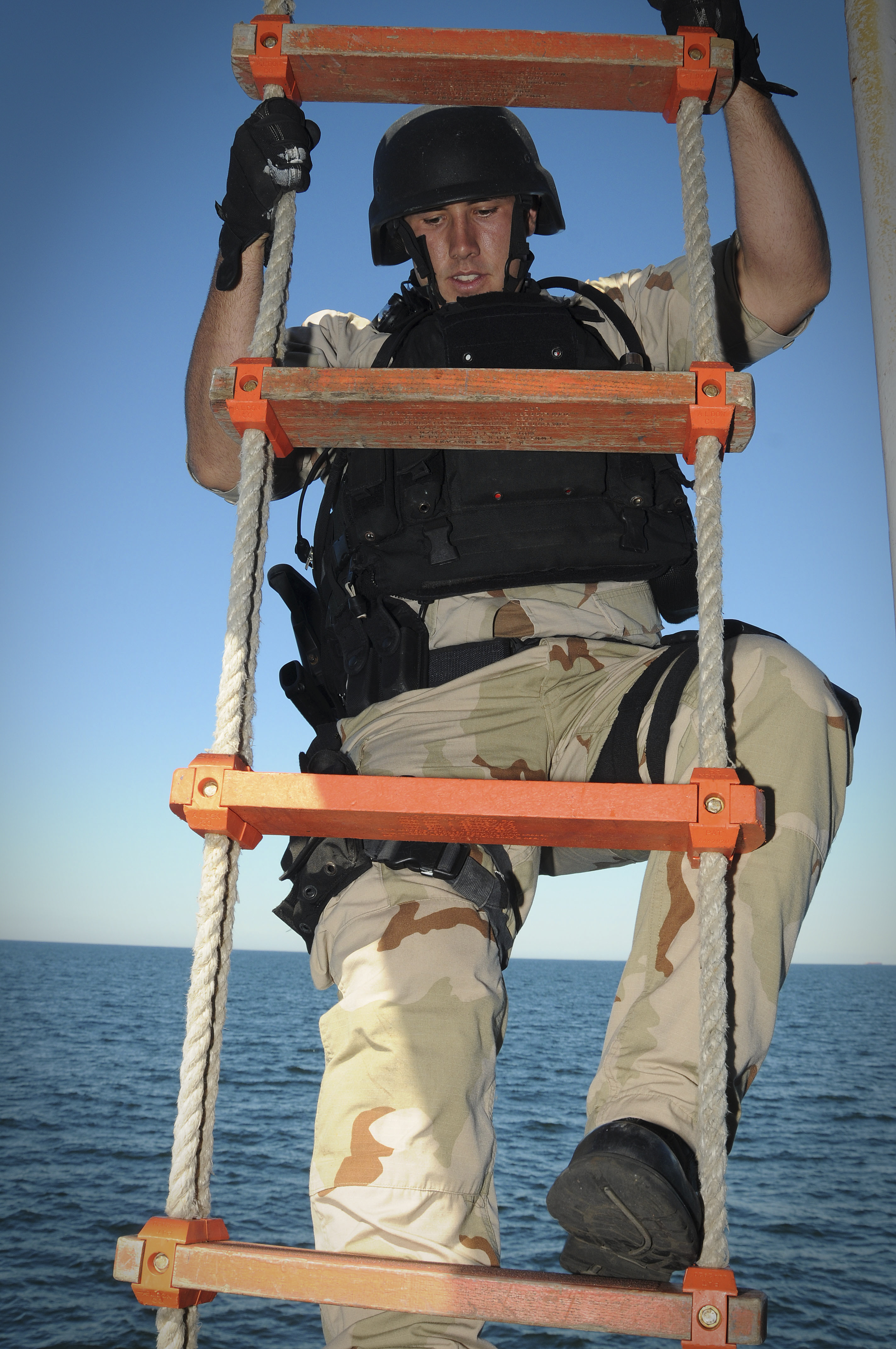
A sailor climbing a Jacob's ladder to board a vessel

The term Jacob's ladder, used on a ship, applies to two kinds of rope ladders. The term may also appear without the apostrophe, as Jacobs ladder.

== Types ==
The first type of Jacob's ladder is a flexible hanging ladder. It consists of vertical ropes or chains supporting horizontal, historically round and wooden, rungs. Today, flat runged flexible ladders are also called Jacob's ladders.

They are used to allow access over the side of ships, and as a result, pilot ladders are often incorrectly referred to as Jacob's ladders. A pilot ladder has specific regulations on step size, spacing and the use of spreaders. It is the use of spreaders (long treads that extend well past the vertical ropes) in a pilot ladder that distinguishes it from a Jacob's ladder.

When not being used, the ladder is stowed away, usually rolled up, rather than left hanging. On late 19th-century warships, this kind of ladder would replace the normal fixed ladders on deck during battle. Fixed ladders, and railings, would be removed and replaced with Jacob's ladders and ropes in preparation for battle. This was done to prevent such wooden elements from blocking line of sight or turning into shrapnel when hit by enemy shells.

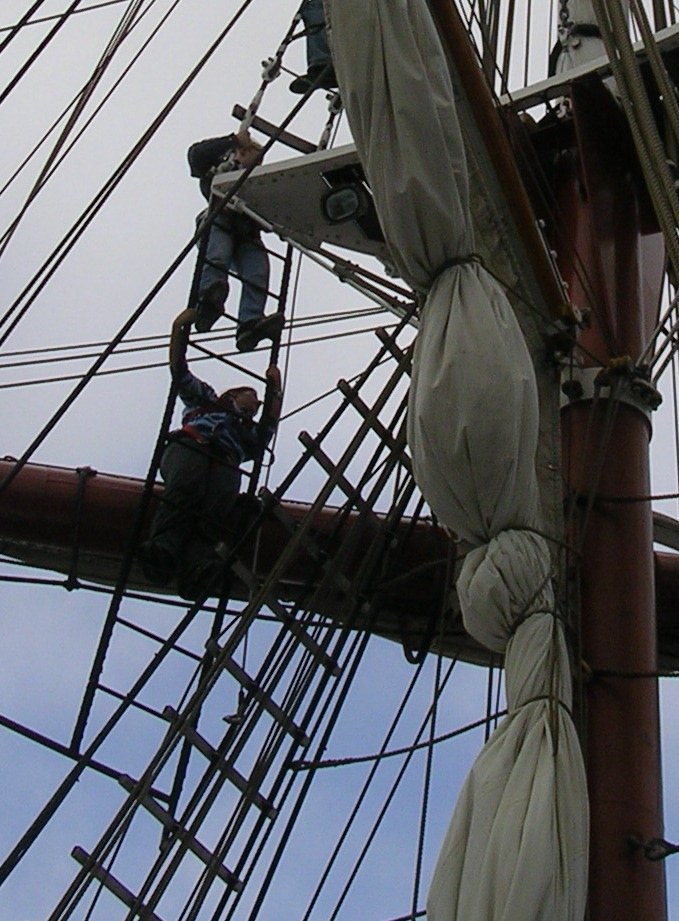
Crew on a square rigged ship climbing onto the main-top using the Jacob's ladder

The second type of Jacob's ladder applies to a kind of ladder found on square rigged ships. To climb above the lower mast to the topmast and above, sailors must get around the top, a platform projecting from the mast. Although on many ships the only way round was the overhanging futtock shrouds, modern-day tall ships often provide an easier vertical ladder from the ratlines as well. This is the Jacob's ladder.

While they were a popular way of boarding a vessel or carrying out shipside maintenance during the era of wooden ships, and even as recently as the 1950s, their use today on board modern merchant ships is minimal due to obvious safety issues. Today, Jacob's ladders are used only to board lifeboats and liferafts and as a draft ladder.

== Origin ==
The term "Jacob's Ladder" is said to have come from the Bible, Genesis 28:12, when Jacob has a dream of a ladder which reached to heaven.
