= Masthead rig =

Sailing rig type

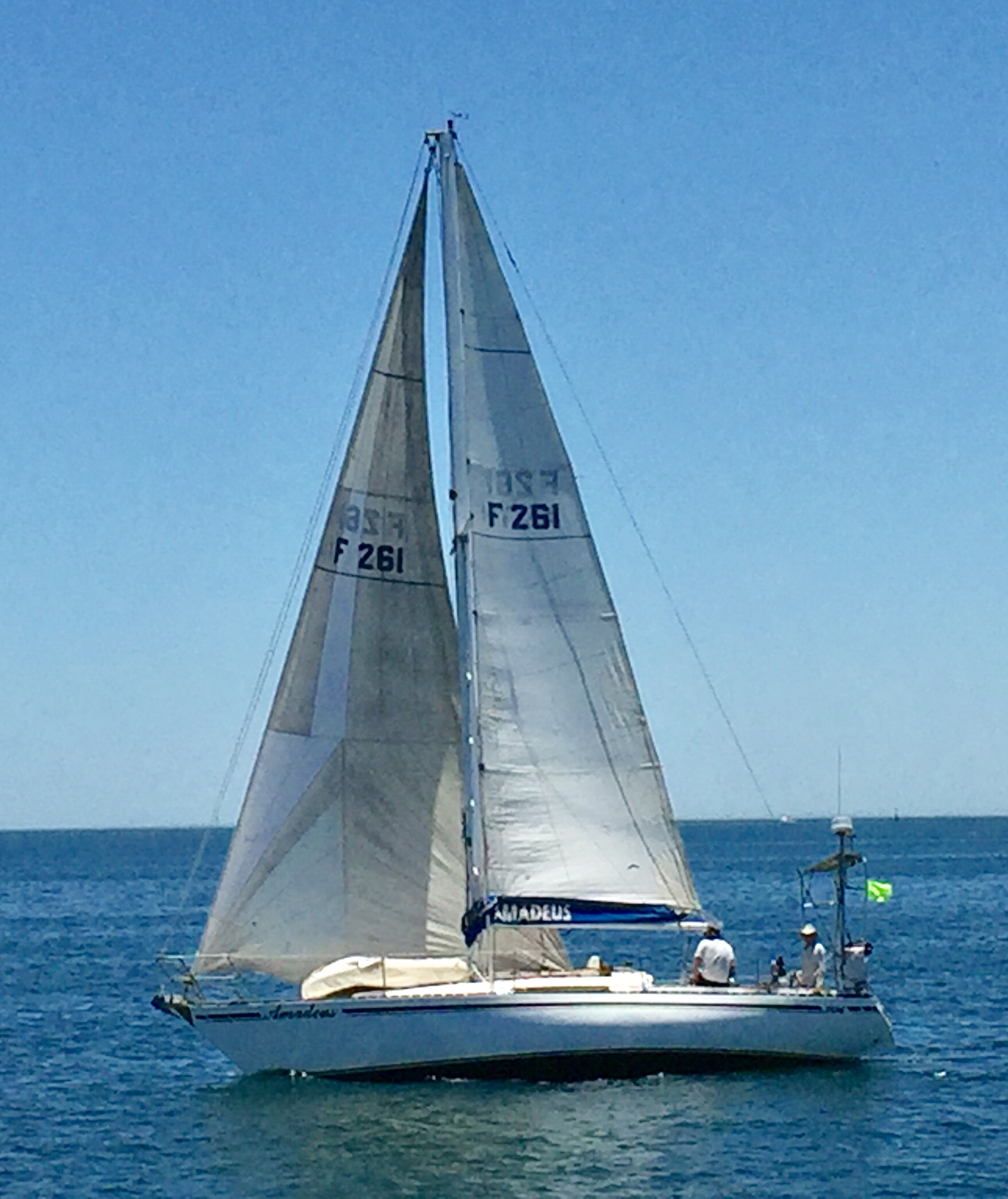
A UFO 34 an example of a masthead-rigged yacht

A masthead rig on a sailing vessel consists of a forestay and backstay both attached at the top of the mast.

The Bermuda rig can be split into two groups: the masthead rig and the fractional rig. The masthead rig has larger and more headsails, and a smaller mainsail, compared to the fractional rig.

The major advantage a masthead sloop has over a fractional one, is that the jib is larger. Since the jib has no mast in front of it to cause turbulent airflow over it, it is considered much more efficient than the main, especially for sailing up wind. Also, since the fore stay is attached to the top of the mast, it pulls directly against the back stay. Tightening the back stay, then, increases the tension on the fore stay. This is useful because the jib needs considerable fore stay tension to set well. This need increases in direct proportion to the wind speed and jib size. Increasing the tension on the back stay does not tend to bend the mast, as it would on a fractional sloop. It puts the mast in compression instead. For this reason the mast on a mast head rig has a thicker section at the top to stand this load.

One reason this rig is used on oceangoing boats is that it can be made quite strong, as every part of it, except the boom, is in either tension or compression. This rig requires a much stiffer hull than a fractional sloop rig to take these rigging loads, so is not well suited for lightly built boats.

A major disadvantage is that, to shorten sail, the jib must be reefed as well as the main. If the jib is taken in and the main left standing, the main will have a strong tendency to weathercock the boat into the wind, making it uncontrollable. There are four typical remedies used: 1.) put reef points in the jib, 2.) have a smaller jib to set in place of the full sized one, 3.) have a roller furling mechanism that rolls up the jib like window shade, and 4.) have two jibs instead of one (often referred to as a 'cutter' rig), so one of the jibs can be taken in.

== See also ==
- Fractional rig
- Gaff rig
