= Worm, parcel and serve =

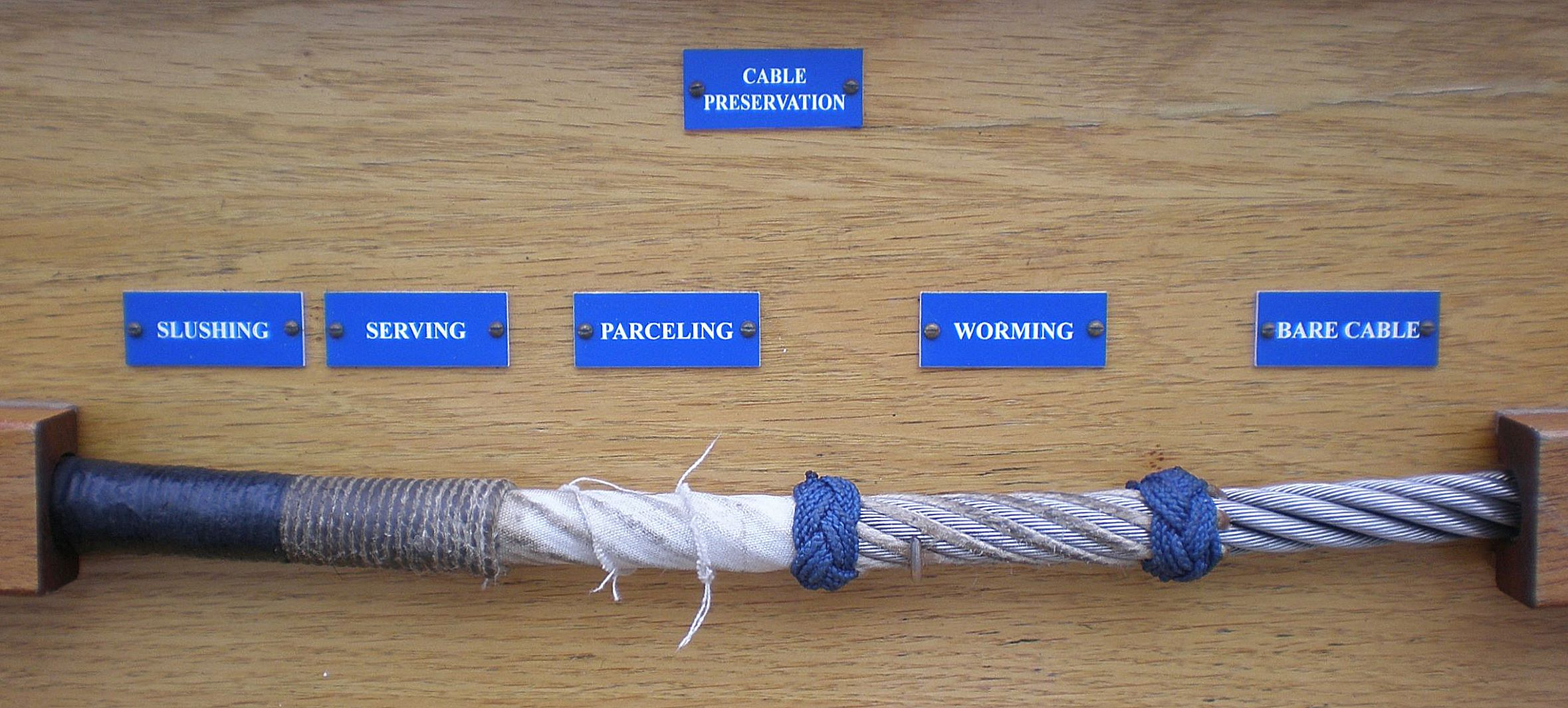
Working steps

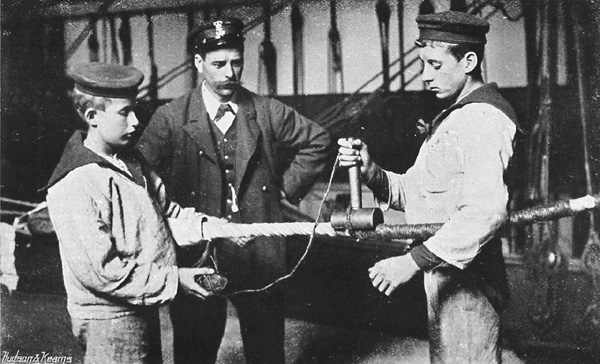
Serving in action

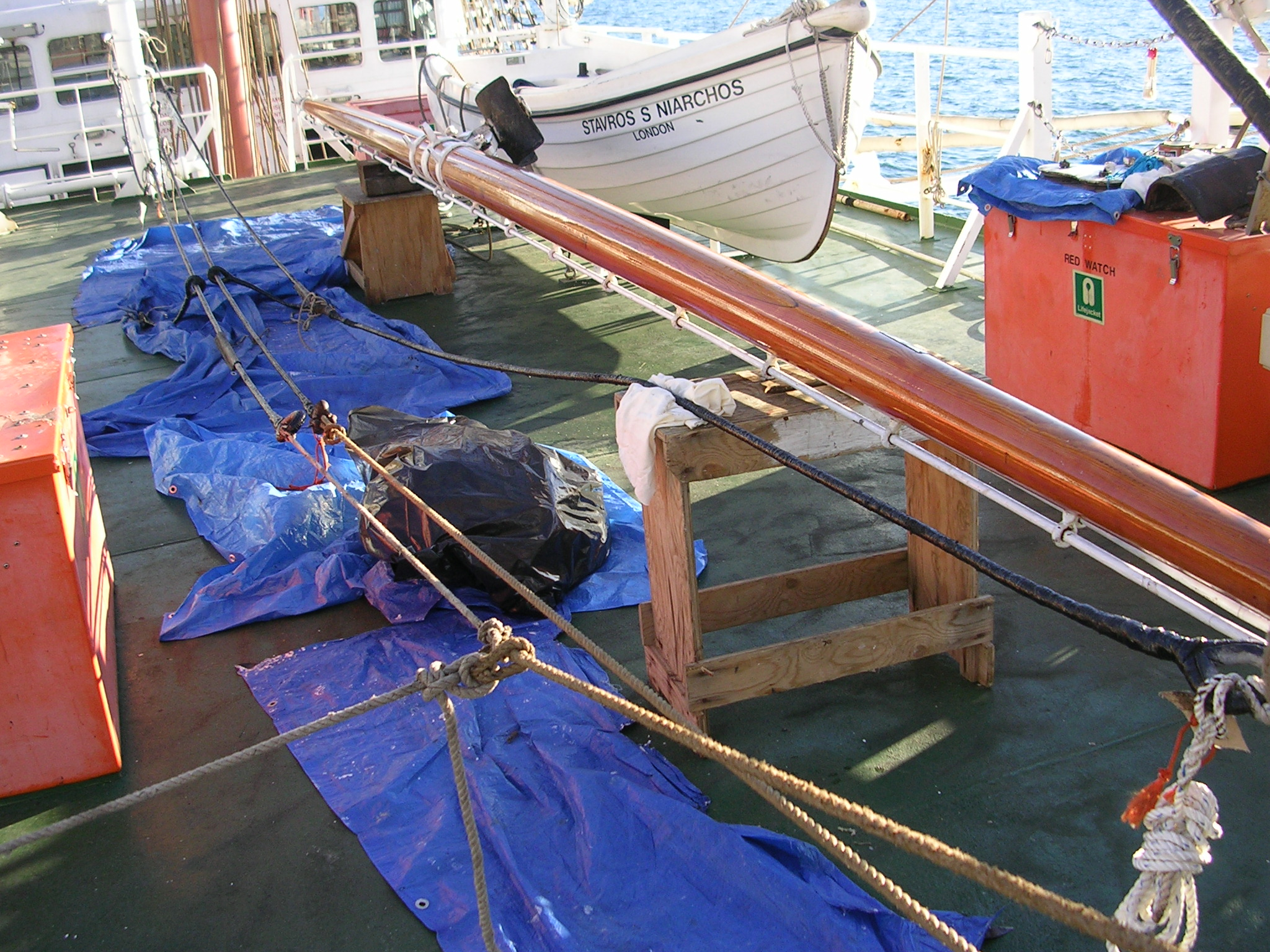
The standing rigging belonging to this yard (such as the black-coated lift ending at the right edge of the picture) is wormed, parcelled and served, and painted, as described below.

To worm, parcel and serve a line is to apply a multi-layered protection against chafe and deterioration to standing rigging. It is a technique not usually used on modern small boats, but is found extensively on traditionally-rigged sailing ships. Worming, parcelling and serving —referred to collectively as "service"— is traditionally applied only to traditional twisted rope, either natural fiber or steel wire-rope, not the braided line almost exclusively used on modern vessels, but some traditional vessels now use modern high modulus braided lines (like Amsteel or AS-90) in place of wire rope (to save weight aloft) and serve the line to maintain the traditional appearance. It can be applied to the entire length of a line, such as a shroud, or selectively, to specific parts of a line, such as over the spliced ends of a stay, where the chafe on the middle section of the stay precludes complete protection.

== Technique ==
=== Worming ===
"Worming" the line is designed to fill in the channels (the contlines) between the strands in order to keep water out and to allow tighter, smoother wrapping of the next layers by giving the rope a more cylindrical shape. Lengths of "small stuff" or string are led along the lay of the rope between the strands, following the twist so that they spiral round the main line. For larger lines, such as the natural (e.g. hemp) fiber rigging used on early vessels, "sister worming" could be built up from several different sizes of "small stuff", as was needed to fill in the typically larger cuntlines of cable-laid hemp rope.

In the days of hemp anchor cable, worming of chain was used, when anchoring on a rocky bottom, to protect the anchor cable from chafing through. This was not then covered with parcelling and serving, but is included here as a further example of the utility of the technique.

On the rigging of modern small craft, where the cuntlines are not so deep as to leave large gaps beneath the parcelling (where moisture can become trapped and corrosion occur), or to create a facetted surface (as opposed to a smooth, round surface), worming is often omitted from the process.

=== Parcelling ===
The line is then "parcelled" by wrapping it in a spiral fashion with long overlapping strips of thin canvas. This is wound from bottom to top, the edge of the progressing strip slightly overlapping the previous wrap to create a shingled effect, to prevent water from entering. Often the strips of canvas are either saturated with Stockholm tar as they are applied, or painted with tar after the parcelling is complete, immediately prior to the process of serving. The tar helps fill any remaining gaps in the cuntlines as well as creating a waterproof seal over the line within. As with worming, parcelling is applied in the same direction as the twist of the line being covered. The rule is "worm and parcel with the lay; turn and serve the other way".

When parcelling is used on modern small craft, friction tape or cotton athletic tape can be used for the purpose.

On rare occasions, when parcelling is not to be served (e.g., for short term use to protect a line against chafe), it should be applied against the lay of the line, counter to that guiding rhyme. In these circumstances, the parcelling itself is filling the protective role that serving would do.

=== Serving ===
The outer layer of protection is formed of twine wrapped as tightly as possible around the line, each progressive turn of the twine laid as close as possible against the last, covering the line completely. Following the rhyme above, it should have course run against the lay of the rope; this alternation helps prevent sideways chafe from opening up the protection. Traditionally hemp "marline" was and still is used for service; on modern small craft three-strand nylon "seine twine" is often used.

A serving board or serving mallet can be used to help get the outer twine as tight as possible. Despite the name (arising from its shape) the serving mallet is not used to hit anything; it forms a kind of guide and tensioning lever for applying the twine to the rope.

=== Tar ===
An optional final stage for the permanent protection of "served" rope is to paint the outer layer of twine with a mixture of tar, varnish and black paint. This needs renewing periodically, and going aloft to paint footropes, shrouds, stays, and other served rigging is one of the regular maintenance tasks on many tall ships.

The tar, or "slush" is a mixture of Stockholm tar, boiled linseed oil, and Japan drier. Many "recipes" for slush exist, but the intent is always to allow a penetrating coat of preservative pine tar that then cures to a harder finish that will not so easily rub off on sails and crew. The term "slush" is also used to describe the grease applied to the masts to lubricate the parrels so that the yards can raise and lower freely.
