= Chains (nautical) =

Small platforms on the side of a ship

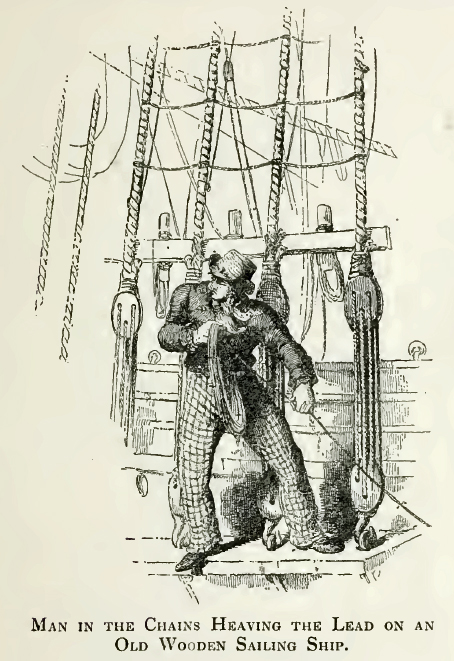
Heaving the lead. A man standing in the chains.

The chains, also called the chain-wales or channels, were small platforms, built on either side of the hull of a ship, used to provide a wide purchase for the shrouds, and to assist in the practice of depth sounding.

The chains provided a platform for a 'leadsman', the sailor assigned to swing the sounding line, or 'lead' into the water. The term originated from the practice of the sailor standing between the shrouds when casting the line, which were attached to the hull by chainplates, or, in earlier sailing ships, to lengths of chain along the ship's side. A length of chain was usually fixed at waist height to the stanchions above the chains, as an added safety measure. The chains were common on large sailing vessels, but the role of leadsman and swinging the lead to obtain depth soundings declined with developments in echo sounding, and ships are rarely now equipped with chains.
