= Chainplate =

Fittings on sailing ships

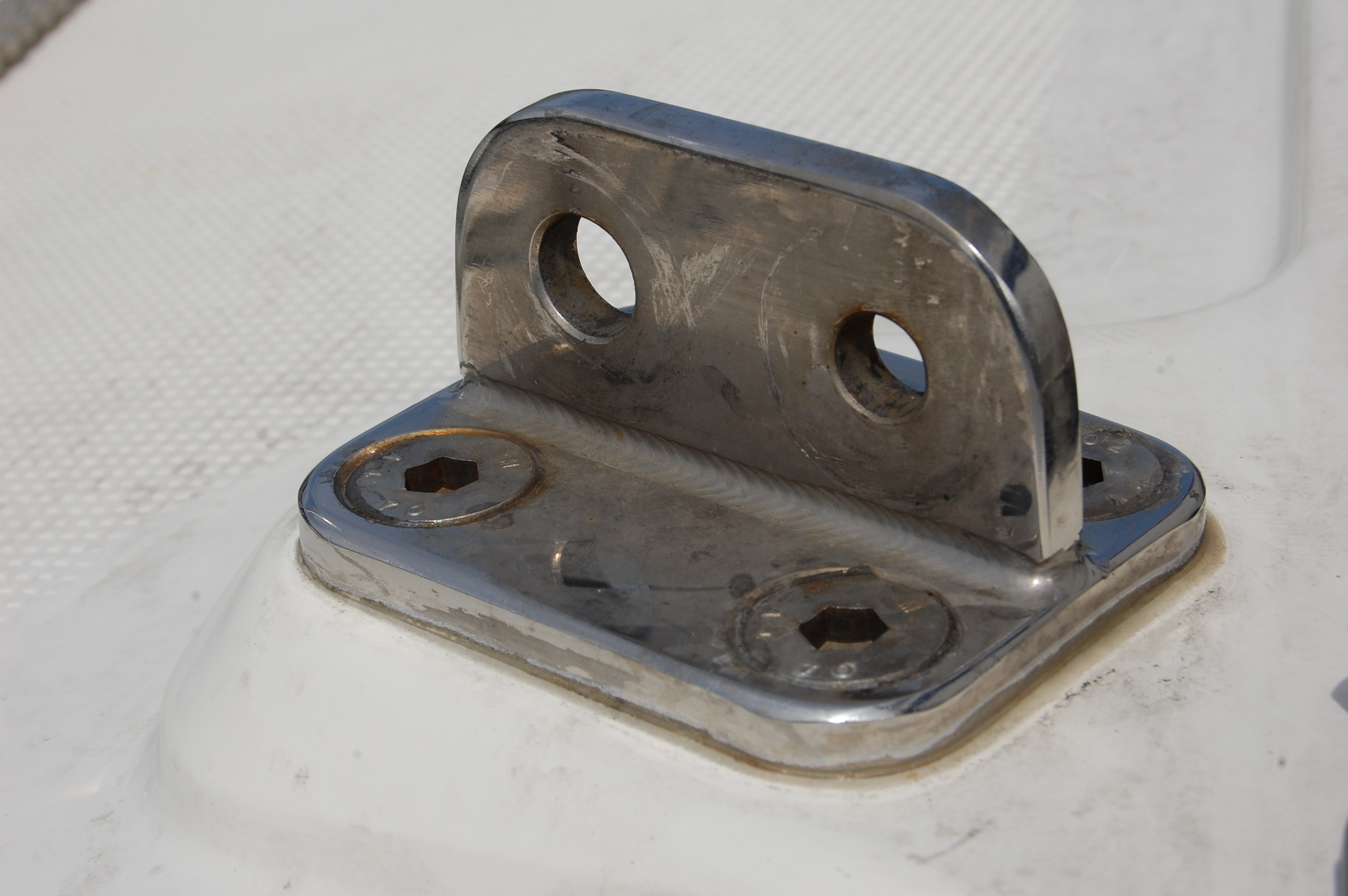
Chainplate on a Bavaria 35 Match without shrouds mounted.

A chainplate is a metal plate used to fasten a shroud or stay to the hull of a sailboat to support the mast that sails are attached to. One end of the chainplate is normally fastened to a turnbuckle which is connected to the shroud or stay, whereas the remainder of the chainplate normally has multiple holes that are bolted to the hull, or the chains. This distributes the load across the hull, making it possible for a somewhat lighter hull to support the load of the shrouds and stays. Chainplates are commonly made from stainless steel or bronze. Stainless steel will corrode over time but bronze lasts the life of the yacht.

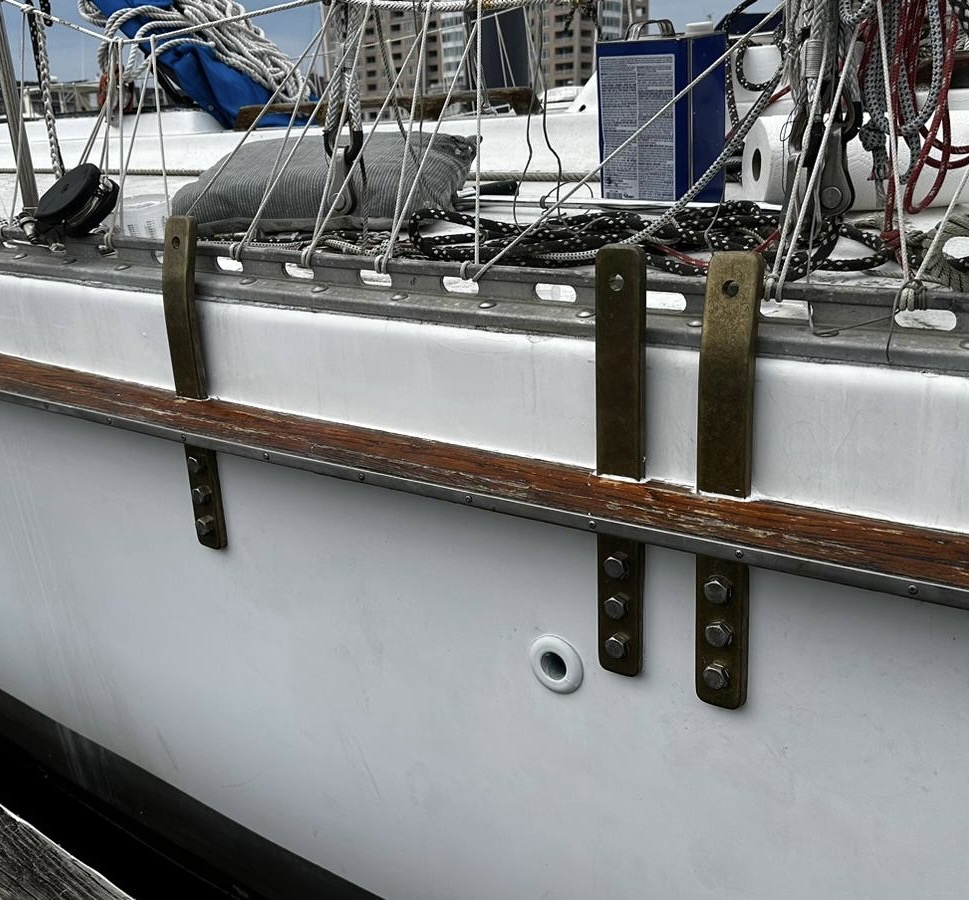
Bronze external chainplates
