= Catharpin =

On sailing ships, the catharpins are the short ropes or iron clamps used to brace in the shrouds toward the masts so as to give a freer sweep to the yards. On sailing yachts, the catharpins are the short lashings which hold halyards away from the masts by tying to adjacent shrouds so as to prevent noise and fraying by the wind.

Example from Two Years Before the Mast by Richard Henry Dana: "All the hides, too, that came down in the boats were soaked with water, and unfit to put below, so that we were obliged to trice them up to dry, in the intervals of sunshine or wind, upon all parts of the vessel . . . The rail, fore and aft, the windlass, capstan, the sides of the ship, and every vacant place on deck, were covered with wet hides, on the least sign of an interval for drying. Our ship was nothing but a mass of hides, from the cat-harpins to the water's edge, and from the jib-boom-end to the taffrail."
