= Pilot ladder =

Specialized ladder used on cargo ships

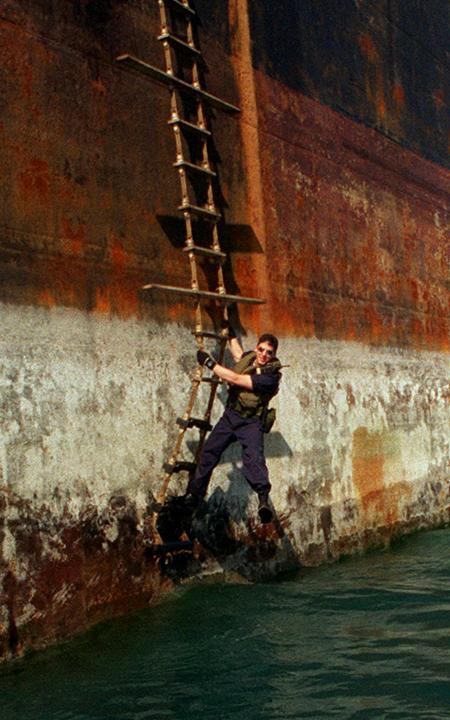
A United States Navy petty officer uses the pilot ladder of an Iranian cargo ship during a maritime interdiction operation in the Persian Gulf.

A pilot ladder is a highly specialized form of rope ladder, typically used on board cargo vessels for the purposes of embarking and disembarking pilots. The design and construction of the ladders is tightly specified by international regulation under the SOLAS regime. Pilot ladders and other boarding arrangements must be carefully prepared for each operation, with the equipment inspected and verified as safe to use before each boarding takes place. Additional requirements relate to the use of man-ropes, platforms, accommodation ladders, combination ladders and securing methods.

== Construction ==
The ladders are made by threading and fixing a series of hardwood, machined steps, each not more than 400 mm × 115 mm × 25 mm (15.75 in × 4.53 in × 0.98 in), onto two pairs of minimum 18 mm (0.71 in) diameter manila ropes, and binding each step to the ropes at 310 ± 5 mm (12.20 ± 0.20 in) intervals. At a maximum interval of eight steps, the standard step is replaced by a spreader, which is an elongated version of the standard machined step, with a minimum length of 1.8 m (5 ft 11 in). The spreader's function is to prevent the ladder from twisting in the prevailing weather conditions when in use.

The lowest four steps of the ladder are normally made from a synthetic or composite resin, which is more resistant than hardwood, to the interaction between the host vessel and the pilot boat coming alongside.

Because the decks of most commercial ships are far above the waterline, pilots and others who need to come aboard at sea can usually only do so if a pilot ladder is put out. When not being used, the ladder is stowed away (usually rolled up) rather than left hanging. Alternative arrangements such as ship-side doors with ladders may also be allowed if approved by a Classification Society.

The use of shackles to secure the ladder is generally not permitted, instead knots should be tied to a fixed securing point on the deck of the ship.

== Incidents ==
Unsafe pilot ladders or pilot boarding arrangements not in compliance with regulation have resulted in numerous injuries or deaths of marine pilots and other persons at sea. In January 2023, a pilot died on the River Humber while boarding via pilot ladder. In May 2023, a Japanese pilot died in a pilot ladder incident in the port of Nagasaki.

== Regulations and guidance ==
The Pilot Ladder Manual, published by the Witherbys in 2024 details regulations and procedures for ships and maritime pilot embarkation and disembarkation.

In June 2025, the International Maritime Organization adopted amendments to SOLAS Regulation V/23 on pilot ladders and the associated new Performance Standards for pilot transfer arrangements, including pilot ladder requirements (to take effect 1 January 2028).

== See also ==
- Accommodation ladder
- Jacob's ladder (nautical)
