= Forestay =

Part of a sailing rig

1 – mainsail 2 – staysail 3 – spinnaker 4 – hull 5 – keel 6 – rudder 7 – skeg 8 – mast 9 – spreader 10 – shroud 11 – sheet 12 – boom 13 - mast 14 – spinnaker pole 15 – backstay 16 – forestay 17 – boom vang

On a sailing vessel, a forestay, sometimes just called a stay, is a piece of standing rigging which keeps a mast from falling backwards. It is attached either at the very top of the mast, or in fractional rigs between about 1/8 and 1/4 from the top of the mast. The other end of the forestay is attached to the bow of the boat.

Often a sail is attached to the forestay. This sail may be a jib or a genoa. In a cutter rig, the jib or jibs are flown from stays in front of the forestay, perhaps going from the masthead to a bowsprit. The sail on the forestay is then referred to as the staysail or stays'l.

A forestay might be made from stainless steel wire on a modern yacht, solid stainless steel rod, carbon rod, or ultra high molecular weight polyethylene (such as Spectra or Dyneema) on a high-performance racing boat, and galvanised wire or natural fibers on an older cutter or square-rigged ship.

== See also ==
- Backstay
- Shroud (sailing)
