= Trip pilot =

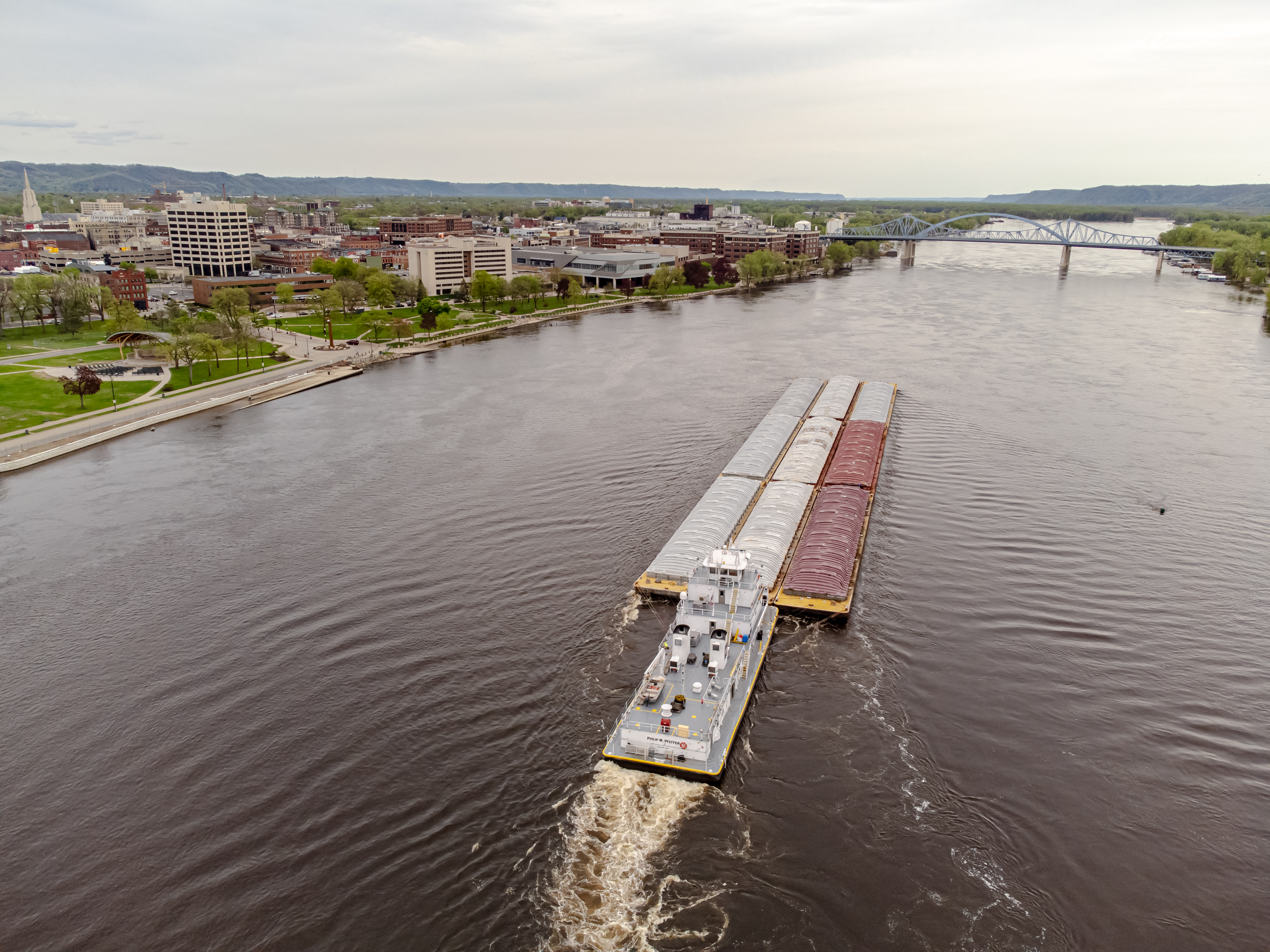
A push boat.

Trip pilot is a term applied to captains temporarily or occasionally employed on inland towing vessels in the United States of America. Trip pilots hold a Master of Towing Vessels license issued by the U.S. Coast Guard, and are employed in the commercial tug and barge industry, primarily in the inland brown water trade on push boats operating on the Mississippi River and Intracoastal Waterway.
