= Fractional rig =

Sailing rig type

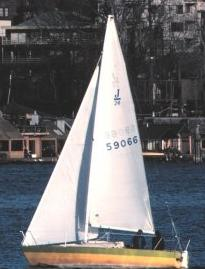
A J/24 showing its fractional rig.

A fractional rig on a sailing vessel consists of a foresail, such as a jib or genoa sail, that does not reach all the way to the top of the mast.

The forestay is a wire that secures the mast to the front of the boat. With a fractional rig, the forestay is attached between about 1/8 and 1/4 of the length of the mast lower down, rather than being attached to the top of the mast as in a masthead rig. The foresail (jib or genoa) is then rigged to this stay. The mast is farther forward on the boat than on a masthead rig and so it has a larger mainsail. Masthead rigs are most common on larger keelboats or cruisers. A fractional rig is typically used on sailing dinghies and racing oriented keelboats, such as the J/24.

Fractional rigs were introduced on race boats in order to allow more controllability of the surface of the mainsail and also less drag when sailing upwind. According to one manufacturer, "a key to making fast boats easier to sail than slow boats is the 'fractional rig'".

Fractional rigs tend to have a larger mainsail and a smaller headsail which is often a non-overlapping jib. This configuration is optimized for upwind sailing efficiency. For downwind sailing without a spinnaker, the larger mainsail of a fractional rig has a significant advantage over a masthead rig but a disadvantage when spinnakers are flown. Many newer high-performance fractional rig sailboats, fly the spinnaker or the gennaker from the masthead. On many modern skiffs and race dinghies, the jib is relatively small compared to the size of the main and it is normally left in place when the spinnaker or gennaker is used due to this type of jib's minimal aerodynamic interference.

Another major advantage of the fractional rig, especially the '3/4' rig (where the forestay goes 3/4 the way up the mast), is that the jib can be taken in without inducing excessive weather helm which could cause the boat to lose control and “round up” into the wind. With the masthead sloop, both the main and the jib must be reduced in size evenly when shortening sail. This is typically accomplished by reefing the main and either rolling up a portion of the headsail on a furler, or changing to a smaller headsail.

Since jibs need considerable forestay tension to set properly and the amount of tension needed increases with wind speed, being able to drop the jib altogether in windy conditions puts less strain on the rig and hull. Fractional rigs are used on lightly built multihulls for this reason.

== History ==
Throughout the 20th century, most sloops of less than 20 feet in length had fractional rigs.

Many (perhaps most) sailing sloops from the first part of the 20th century were fractional rigged. The increased prevalence of fractional rigs on sloops in the early 20th century probably coincided roughly with the disappearance of the gaff rig. One possibility for its increased prevalence during this era is that, relative to a masthead rig, it allows the designer to provide the boat with more sail area without using a bowsprit or a boom that extends beyond the stern, and without demanding that the sails be of a very high aspect ratio. This was important because the sailcloth available in those days made it difficult to construct high-aspect sails.

As sailcloth improved in the second half of the 20th century, it became possible to construct sails of a higher aspect ratio. It therefore became more practical for sloops to be designed with the simpler masthead-rigged mast. Most production sailboats from the '60s and '70s were masthead-rigged sloops. Masthead-rigged sloops typically carry a larger spinnaker than fractional-rigged sloops, and therefore enjoy a speed advantage when racing downwind.

Fractional rigged sloops are starting to become popular again, especially for high-performance racing boats. A fractional rig allows the mast to bend more easily, which in turn allows more adjustment to the shape of the mainsail, especially when sailing upwind. Many people believe that a fractional-rigged sloop is faster upwind than a similar masthead-rigged sloop, especially as the wind strength increases. Most of the newest generation of fractional-rigged sloops fly their spinnakers from the top of the mast. These boats are said to have "masthead spinnakers" and this development gives the boat very good performance both upwind and downwind in all wind strengths.

== Maintaining forestay tension ==
An inherent problem of a fractional rig is its inability to exert as much tension on the forestay as a similar masthead rig. The reason for this is because the attachment point of the forestay is not directly opposite to the backstay. Under certain conditions, the moment arm that results from these offset attachment points can be used to advantage as this is an effective method of inducing bend in the mast which in turn flattens the mainsail. If the distance between the attachment points is too great, a mast of average stiffness will be unable to apply optimum forestay tension, unless one of the following mast-stiffening design features is used:

- Jumper stays — These additional stays and their associated jumper struts limit the amount that the upper portion of the mast can bend and thereby enable tension to be effectively transferred from the backstay to the forestay. Jumper stays were common in the first part of the 20th century. Their biggest disadvantage is weight and windage aloft.
- Running backstays — These are supplemental temporary backstays (one on each side) that attach opposite of the forestay. They are very effective at generating forestay tension, but make the boat more difficult to tack because one running backstay needs to be released and the other one applied each time the boat tacks.
- Swept back spreaders — Swept back spreaders (or rather their associated shrouds, which attach to the deck significantly aft of the mast) provide significant fore-and-aft support to the mast and thereby increase tension in the forestay. The biggest disadvantage of this scheme is that it makes it difficult to deliberately slacken the forestay for the purpose of making the jib fuller in light winds.
