= Backstay =

Piece of standing rigging on a sailing vessel

1 – mainsail 2 – staysail 3 – spinnaker 4 – hull 5 – keel 6 – rudder 7 – skeg 8 – mast 9 – spreader 10 – shroud 11 – sheet 12 – boom 13 - mast 14 – spinnaker pole 15 – backstay 16 – forestay 17 – boom vang

A backstay is a piece of standing rigging on a sailing vessel that runs from the mast to either its transom or rear quarter, counteracting the forestay and jib. It is an important sail trim control and has a direct effect on the shape of the mainsail and the headsail. Backstays are generally adjusted by block and tackle, hydraulic adjusters, or lines leading to winches.

== Types ==
Backstays may be permanent or running.

=== Permanent backstay ===
A permanent backstay is attached to the top of the mast. Running backstays appear in pairs attached about two-thirds of the way up the mast (sometimes at multiple locations along the length of the mast). In general, most modern sailboats have a permanent backstay and some have a permanent backstay combined with running backstays. Backstays are not always found on all vessels, especially smaller ones.

A permanent backstay is attached at the top of the mast and may or may not be readily adjustable. In a masthead rig, tensioning the permanent backstay directly tensions the forestay. This control is used to adjust the amount of "sag" in the headsail. In a fractional rig, tensioning the permanent backstay has two effects: First, the forestay is tensioned (controls sag in headsail) and second, the mast bend is increased, particularly in the upper one-half to one-third of the mast. Increased mast bend tends to reduce the draft (camber) of the mainsail.

A split backstay is a type of pernament backstay where a single backstay is split into two before leading back to both quarters on the transom. This method allows the load of the backstay to be shared as well as allowing for more easily accessible tensioning from two points on either side instead of one in the centre.

=== Running backstay ===
Running backstays always attaches to the mast at a point below the top of the mast and is generally used in conjunction with a permanent backstay. Running backstays are found on both masthead rigs and fractional rigs. There are some rigs for which running backstays may be used without a permanent backstay. This occurs most often where the mainsail has a significant roach or a very large mainsail, especially combined with narrow hull beam. Gaff rigged boats invariably have running backstays with no permanent backstay. In both of these cases the mainsail extends aft of a line from masthead to stern, and so a permanent backstay would interfere with the operation of the sail. As a direct consequence of its attachment point (below the top of the mast) a running backstay is always adjustable because it must be manually engaged and disengaged during every tack or jibe. Adjusting the tension on the running backstay has two effects: First, the forestay is tensioned (controls sag in headsail) and Second, mast bend is increased (the mast becomes more bent). The overall effect of tensioning the running backstay is a shallower mainsail (less camber) combined with a reduction in headsail sag.

If the running backstays lead to the mast where the forestay attaches, the effect of tensioning them is to reduce sag in the headsail, increase mast bend, and flatten the mainsail as a result. Both effects are desirable as the wind increases.

== Backstay insulators ==
Backstay insulators, when used as a pair, are devices which allow for the electrical isolation of a section of wire on a yacht (e.g. the backstay) so that it can be used as an antenna for a single sideband (SSB) radio. They can also be used to reduce the risk to a yacht's crew in the event of a lightning strike.

Since these insulators form part of the rigging, not only must they not leak current, but they must also be strong and durable enough not to fail mechanically under the sometimes tough load conditions experienced in sailing.
