= Ratlines =

Part of ladder on square-rigged ships

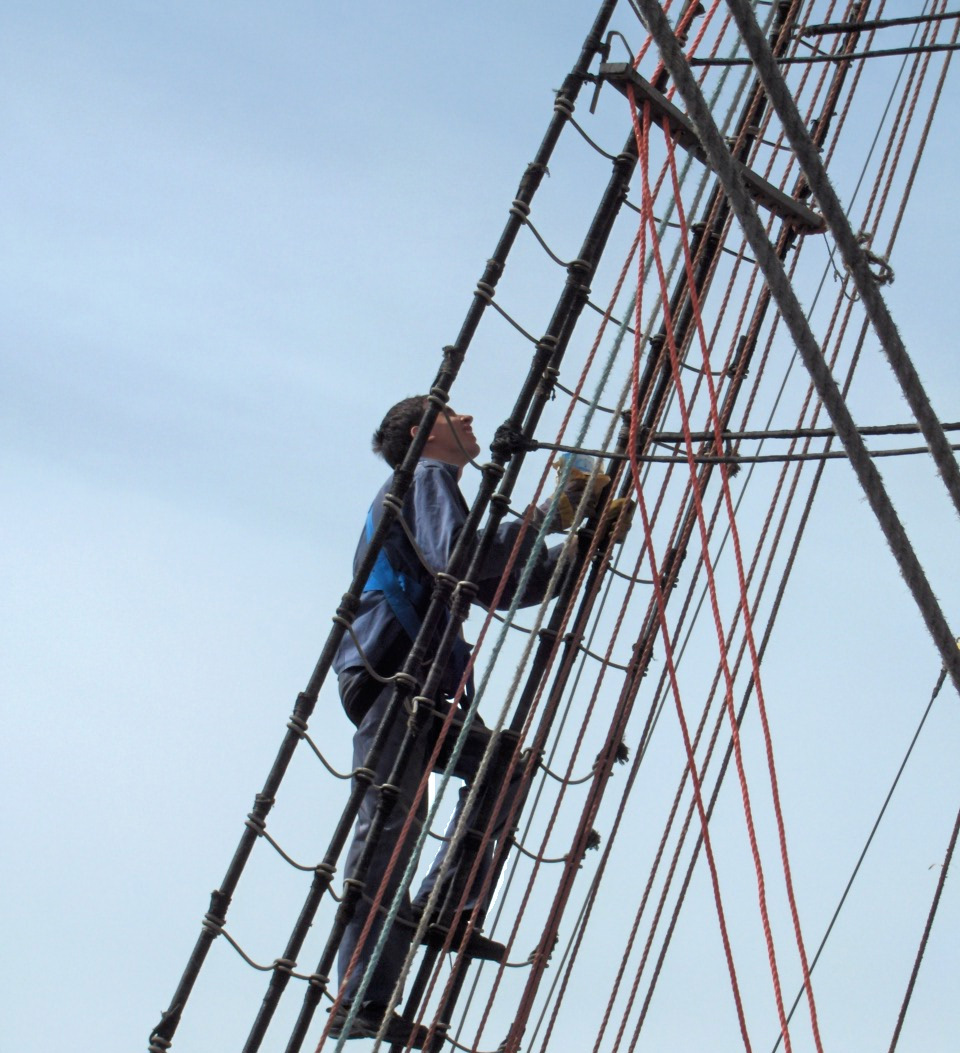
Climbing the ratlines of STS Mir

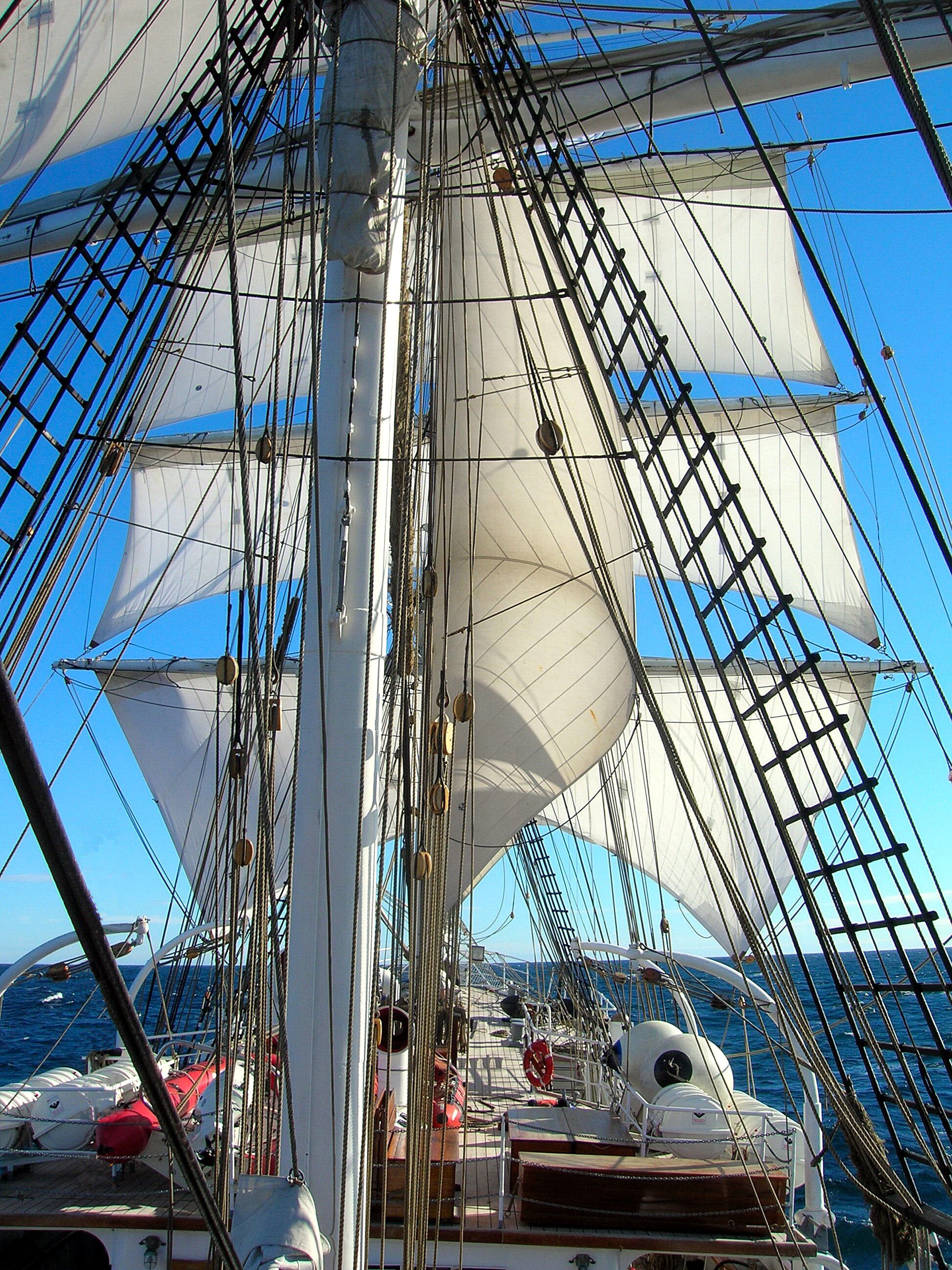
Rat-boards and rigging of Christian Radich

Ratlines (/ˈrætlɪnz/) are lengths of thin line tied between the shrouds of a sailing ship to form a ladder. Found on all square-rigged ships, whose crews must go aloft to stow the square sails, they also appear on larger fore-and-aft rigged vessels to aid in repairs aloft or conduct a lookout from above.

== Rat-boards ==
Rat-boards are lower courses in a ratline, often made of slats of wood (battens) for support where the distance between shrouds is greatest. In some instances holes in these slats guide and organise low-tension lines between the deck and the rig.

== Knotting ==
Although the name clove hitch is given by Falconer in his Dictionary of 1769, the knot is much older, having been tied in ratlines at least as early as the first quarter of the sixteenth century. This is shown in early sculpture and paintings.

— The Ashley Book of Knots

== See also ==
- Footrope
