= Shroud (sailing) =

Part of sailing ship

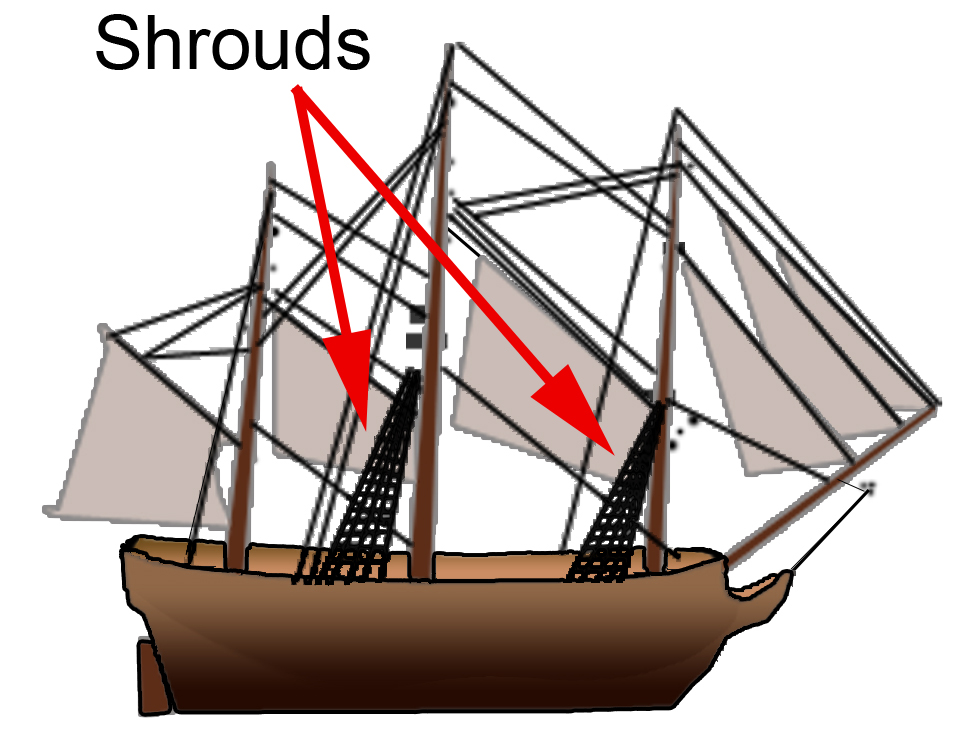
Shrouds as they might have looked on a late 18th-century tall ship.

On a sailing ship, the shrouds are the standing rigging which holds the mast up from side to side. There is frequently more than one shroud on each side of the boat.

Usually a shroud will connect at the top of the mast, and additional shrouds might connect partway down the mast, depending on the design of the boat. Shrouds terminate at their bottom ends at the chain plates, which are tied into the hull. They are sometimes held outboard by channels, a ledge that keeps the shrouds clear of the gunwales.

Shrouds are attached symmetrically on both the port and starboard sides. For those shrouds which attach high up the mast, a structure projecting from the mast must be used to increase the angle of the shroud at the attachment point, providing more support to the mast. On most sailing boats, such structures are called spreaders, and the shrouds they hold continue down to the deck. On large sailing ships, however, particularly square-riggers, the shrouds end at the projections (called tops or crosstrees) and their loads are carried into the mast slightly further down by futtock shrouds.

Contrast with forestay and backstay.

== See also ==
- Chainplate
