= Shear legs =

Type of two-legged frame for lifting loads

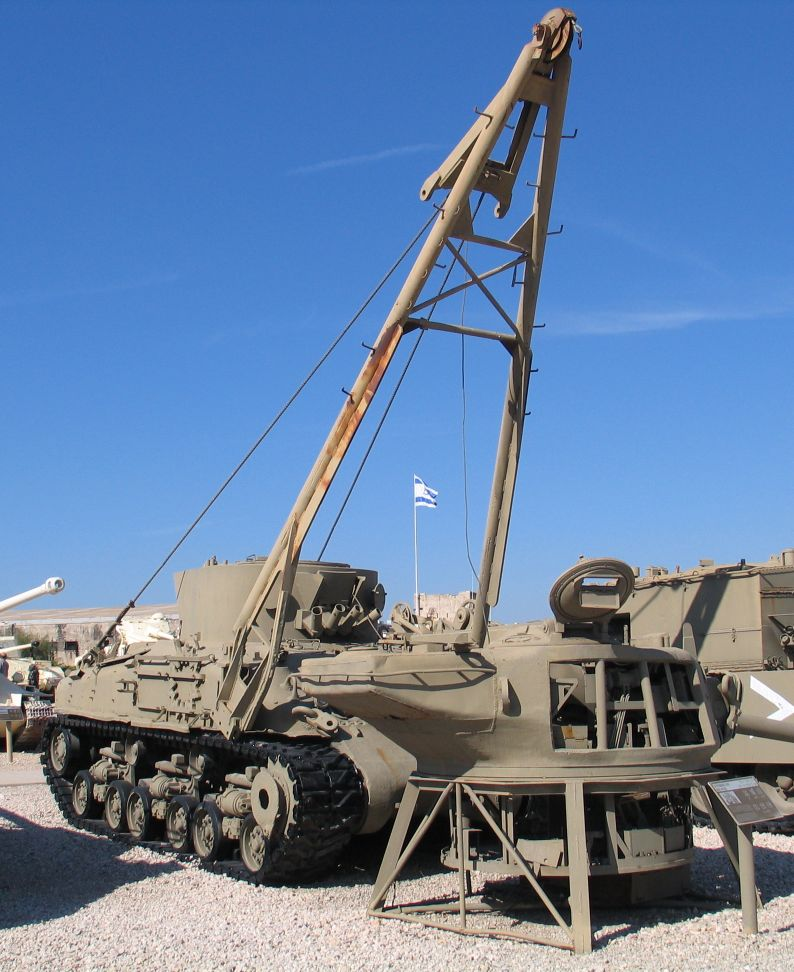
Sheerlegs mounted on an M32 tank recovery vehicle

Shear legs, also known as sheers, shears, or sheer legs, are a form of two-legged lifting device. Shear legs may be permanent, formed of a solid A-frame and supports, as commonly seen on land and the floating sheerleg, or temporary, as aboard a vessel lacking a fixed crane or derrick.

When fixed, they are often used for very heavy lifting, as in tank recovery, shipbuilding, and offshore salvage operations. At dockyards they hoist masts and other substantial rigging parts on board. They are sometimes temporarily rigged on sailboats for similar tasks.

== Uses ==
=== On land ===
Shear legs are a lifting device related to the gin pole, derrick and tripod (lifting device). Shears are an A-frame of any kind of material such as timbers or metal, the feet resting on or in the ground or on a solid surface which will not let them move and the top held in place with guy-wires or guy ropes simply called "guys". Shear legs only need two guys whereas a gin pole needs at least three. The U. S. Army Field Manual FM 5-125 gives detailed instruction on how to rig shears.

=== On water ===
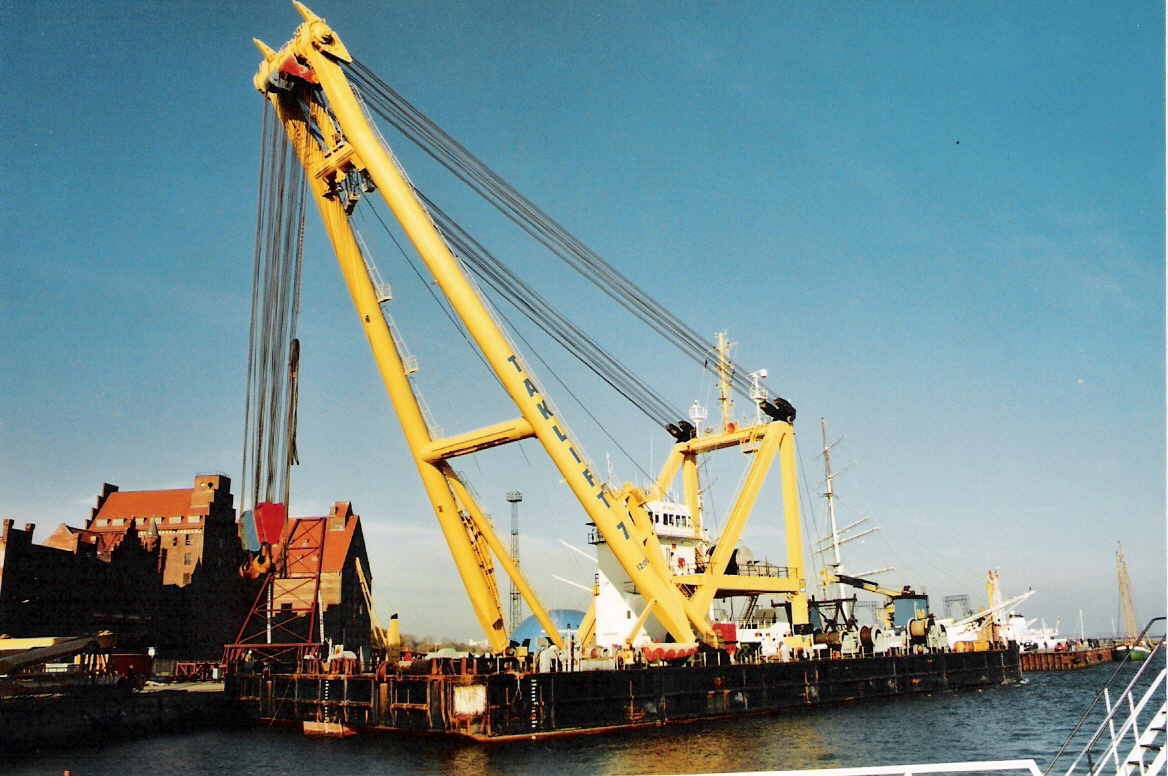
1600 ton maximum lift capacity sheerleg Taklift 7 of Smit International

Fixed shear legs are most commonly found on floating cranes known as floating sheerlegs. These have heavy A-frame booms and vary in lifting capacity between 50 and 4,000 tons, and are used principally in shipbuilding, other large scale fabrication, cargo management, and salvage operations.

Temporary sheers comprise two upright spars, lashed together at their heads and their feet splayed apart. Unlike in a gyn, which has three legs and is thus stable without support, stability in sheers (derricks, and single-legged gin poles) is provided by a guy. The heels of the spars are secured by splay and heel tackles. The point at the top of the sheers where the spars cross and are lashed together is the "crutch", to which a block and tackle is attached. Unlike derricks, sheers need no lateral support, and only require either a foreguy and an aftguy or a martingale and a topping lift. Being made of two spars rather than one, sheers are stronger than a derrick of the same size and made of equivalent materials. Unlike the apex of a gyn, which is fixed, the crutch of a sheers can be topped up or lowered, via the topping lift, through a limited angle. In the era of sailing vessels, it was common for dockyards to employ a sheer hulk, an old floating ship's hull fitted with sheer legs, and used to install masts in other ships.

== See also ==
- Crane (machine)
- Masting sheer
- Sheerleg
