= Derrick =

Lifting device

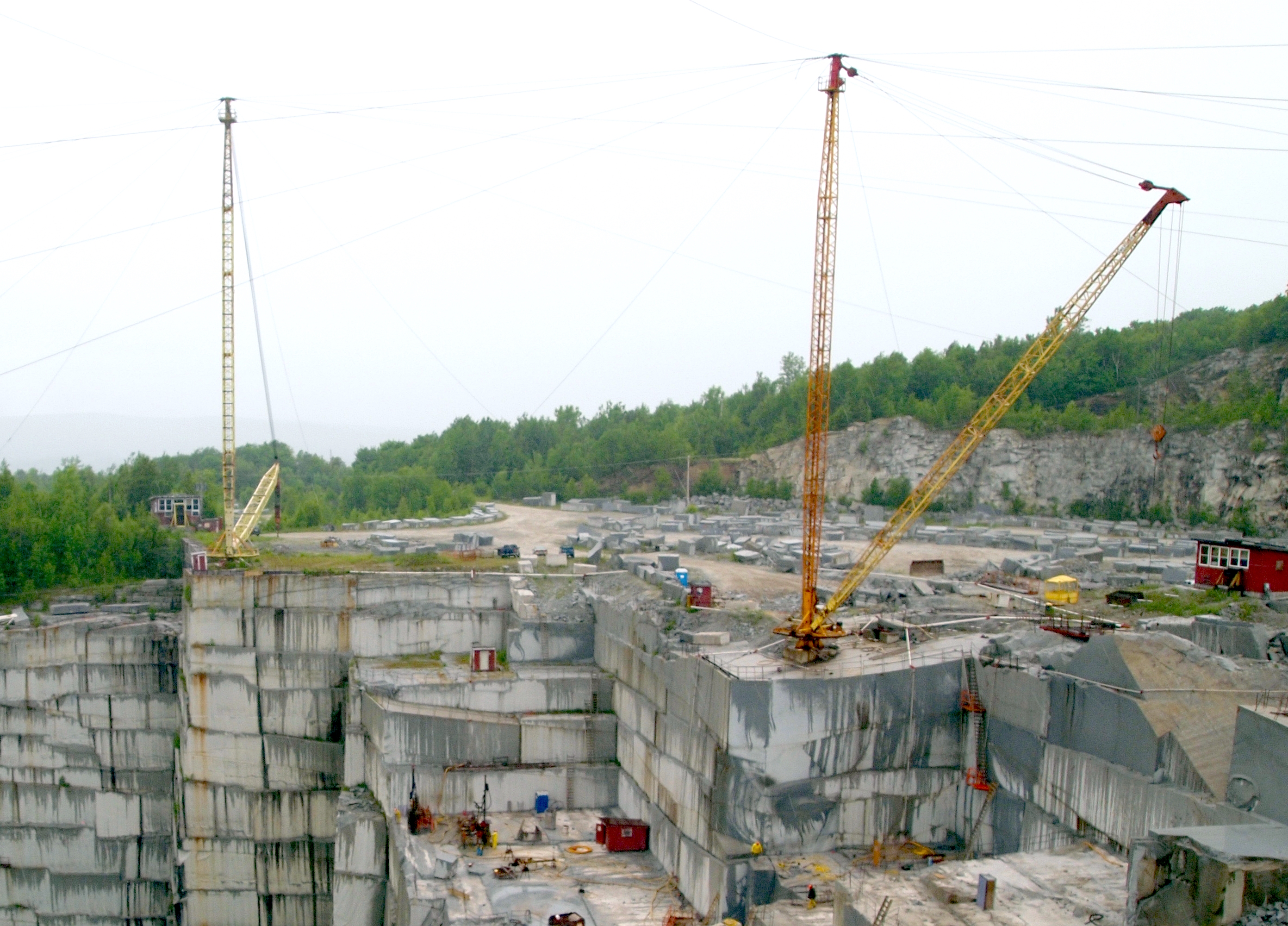
Two guy derricks at a granite quarry

A derrick is a lifting device composed at minimum of one guyed mast, as in a gin pole, which may be articulated over a load by adjusting its guys. Most derricks have at least two components, either a guyed mast or a self-supporting tower and a boom hinged at its base to provide articulation, as in a stiffleg derrick. The most basic type of derrick is controlled by three or four lines connected to the top of the mast, which allow it to both move laterally and cant up and down. To lift a load, a separate line runs up and over the mast with a hook on its free end, as with a crane.

Derricks are especially useful for high-rise rigging, jobs that cover a long period of time, or jobs when the impact to street or pedestrian traffic is a concern. Forms of derricks are commonly found aboard ships and at docking facilities. Large derricks mounted on dedicated vessels are known as floating derricks and shearlegs.

The term derrick is also applied to the framework supporting a drilling apparatus in an oil rig. The derrick derives its name from a type of gallows named after Thomas Derrick, an Elizabethan-era English executioner.

== Types ==
There are various types of derrick based on how the tower or mast is set up and the use of boom.

=== A-frame ===
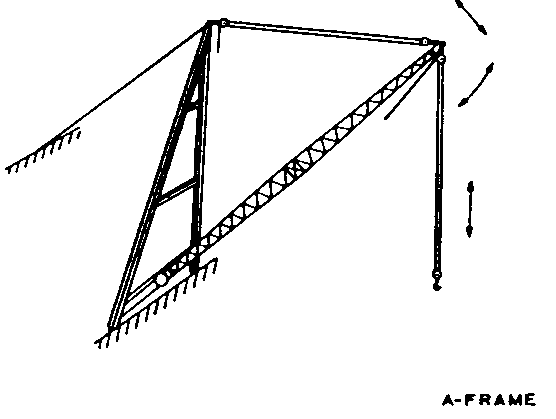
A-frame derrick

An A-frame derrick is one in which the boom is hinged from a cross member between the bottom ends of two upright members spread apart at the lower ends and joined at the top; the boom point secured to the junction of the side members, and the side members are braced or guyed from this junction point.

=== Basket ===
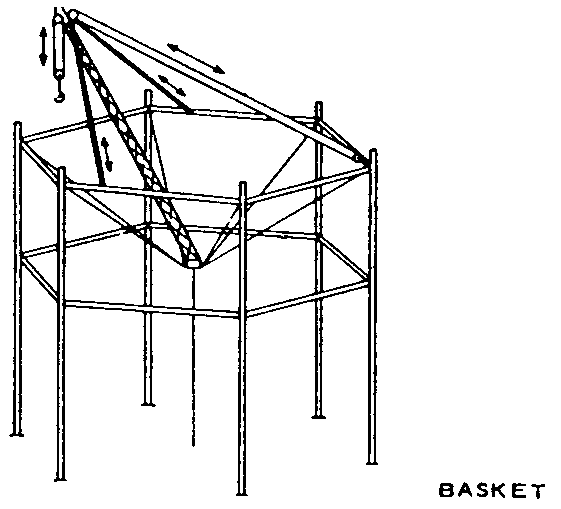
Basket derrick

A basket derrick is a derrick without a boom that is supported by a rope-and-pole system that forms a basket. The basket is constructed from a group of poles to form a polygon. There are crossbars between the pole members to strengthen their support. The supporting ropes are tied to the top of the basket poles on one end and joined together on the other end at a lower elevation than the top of the basket poles to form the base for the derrick tower. The derrick tower can be a mast or a post with the bottom hinged at the base where all ropes meet. The top of the tower is secured with multiple reeved guys to position the top of the tower to the desired location by varying the length of the upper guy lines. The load is lifted using a pulley system connected to the top of the tower.

=== Breast ===
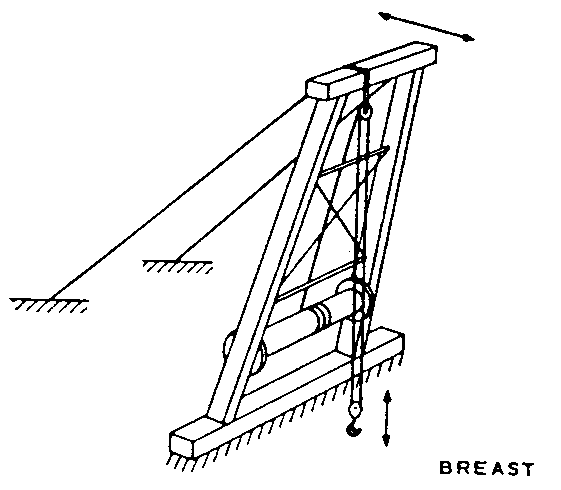
Breast derrick

A breast derrick is a derrick without a boom and with a mast constructed from two upright members. The upright members are more spread at their bottom ends than their top ends. There are crossbars to join the two members from the bottom to the top to form a mast.

=== Chicago boom ===
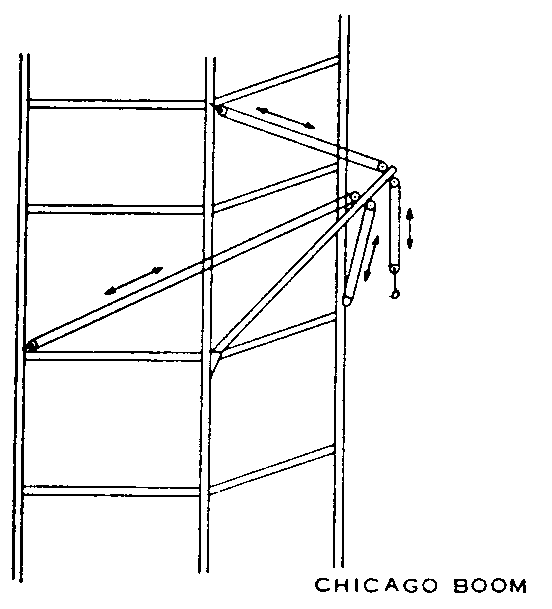
Chicago boom derrick

A Chicago boom derrick is a derrick with a boom which is attached to an external structure. The external upright member of the structure serves as the mast, and the boom is stepped in a fixed socket clamped to the upright. The boom is connected to at least three pulley systems to control the position of the boom. For example, a pulley system is connected to the top of the boom and the higher area of the external structure and two pulley systems near the top of the boom connected on either side of the boom to the external structure. The position of the top of the boom can be controlled by manipulating these pulley systems. The load is lifted from a separate pulley system that is connected to the top of the boom.

=== Gin pole ===
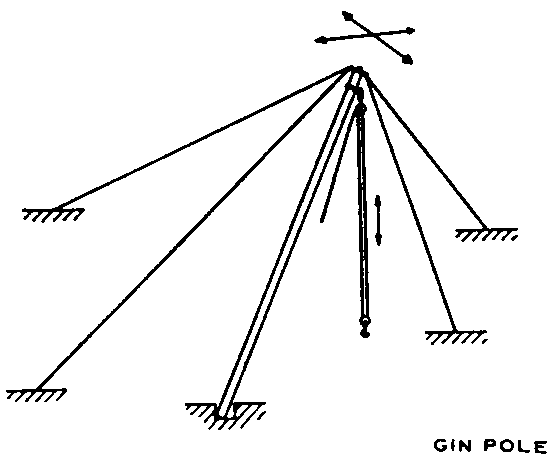
Gin pole derrick

A gin pole derrick (also known as standing derrick or pole derrick) is a derrick without a boom and with single tower or mast supported by four guy wires (two side guys, a fore guy and a rear guy). Its guys are so arranged from its top as to permit leaning the mast in any direction. The base of the tower is hinged and the top of the tower is connected to a pulley system for load lifting. As this is a simple derrick system, it is recommended for use by some agencies as an improvised rescue derrick in an emergency situation where no suitable rescue derrick or crane is available.

=== Guy ===
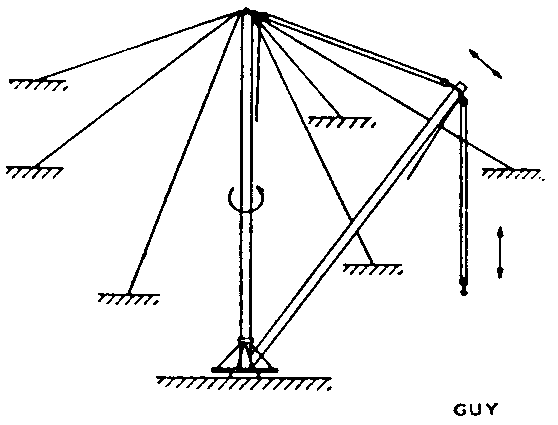
Guy derrick

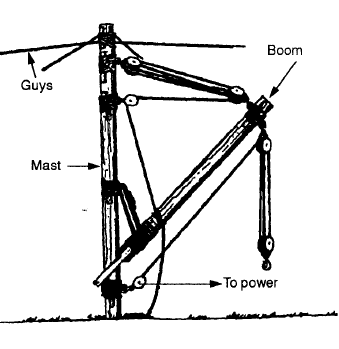
Guy derrick with non-rotatable mast

A guy derrick (also known as boom derrick) is a fixed guyed mast derrick that can be rotated and connected to a boom. The mast is in upright position with the base that can make the mast rotate, but not lean in any direction. The top of the mast is connected to many guy wires which are anchored to the ground to support the load. At the base, the mast is also connect to the bottom end of the boom. The boom extends outward and upward to the desired position. The top of the boom is a pulley system that is connected to the top of the mast to control how far the boom is to be from the mast. When the mast is rotated, the connected boom is swung from to the side. The control of the lifting location is done by the manipulation of the top pulley system and the rotation of the mast at the base. The load is lifted by another pulley system connected to the top of the boom. In a medium load lifting, another construction method can be used. In this case, the mast is fixed without being rotated, but the boom can be swung around the mast. This can be done by connecting the bottom of the boom with two boards on the opposite sides around the surface of the boom to form a fork. The fork and the bottom part of the boom are lashed to secure them together. Another lashing between the fork area and the mast at a higher position supports the weight of the boom. The fork is put around the mast such that the bottom of the boom rests on the mast without being permanently fixed to it. The fork prevents the boom from coming off the mast while it swings up to 180 degrees.

=== Shearleg ===
A shearleg derrick is similar to a breast derrick with the exception that, instead of fixed guy wires that secure the top of the mast, it is secured by multiple reeved guys to permit handling loads at various radii by means of load tackle pulley system suspended from the mast top. In a simpler construction, a shearleg derrick can be assembled from two posts to form A-frame shear legs without any crossbar. The bottom of the legs are set in two holes on the ground, spreading them apart. There is a rope to tie the two legs together near the bottom to prevent them from spreading apart further. On the top side, the two legs are connected together by a lashing but with a small spacer block placed between the legs. A sling, which may be made from ropes, is placed around the area that two legs meet to be used to put a tackle pulley system for lifting the load. There are two guy wires, front and rear, to support the shear legs. The rear guy may be reeved to allow adjustment of the angle of the shear legs.

=== Stiffleg ===
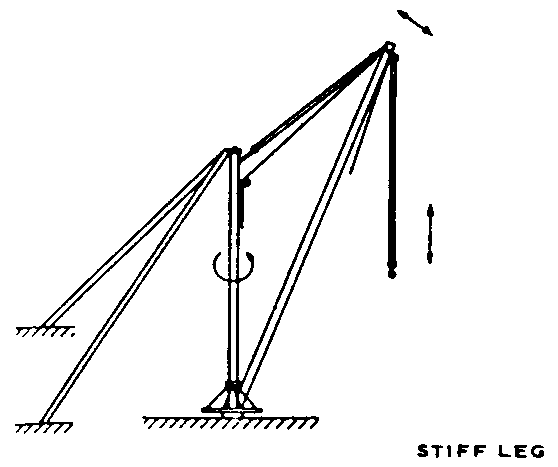
Stiffleg derrick

A stiffleg derrick, also known as a Scotch derrick, is a derrick with a boom similar to that of a guy derrick, but instead of using guy wires to secure the top of the mast, it uses two or more stiff members, called stifflegs, which are capable of resisting either tensile or compressive forces. Sills may also be used to connect between the bottom ends of the stifflegs and the base of the mast. There may be a counterweight to place on the sills behind the stifflegs in heavy load lifting. A stiffleg derrick on a vessel is called a floating stiffleg derrick.

== Oil derrick ==
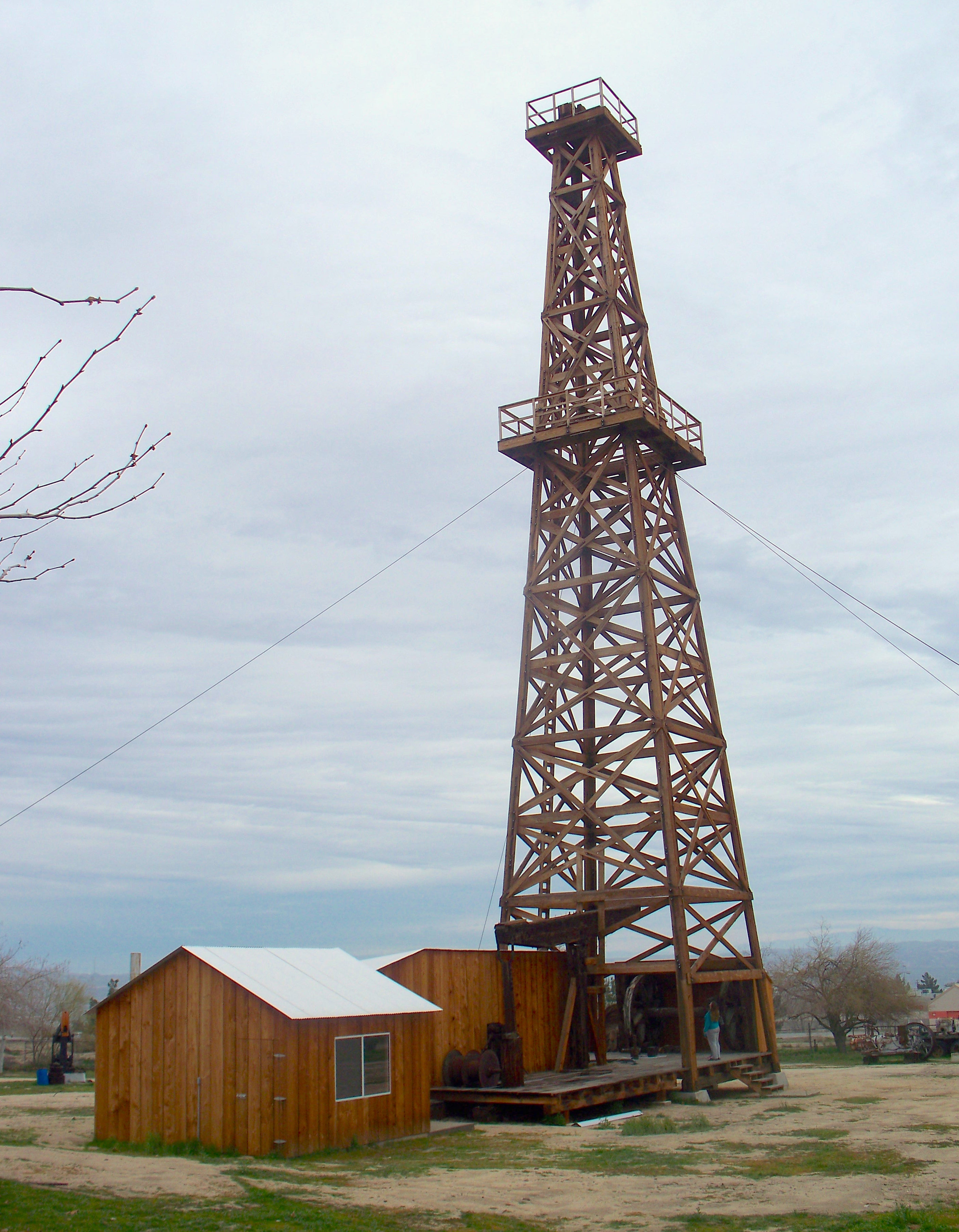
Wooden derrick (1917)

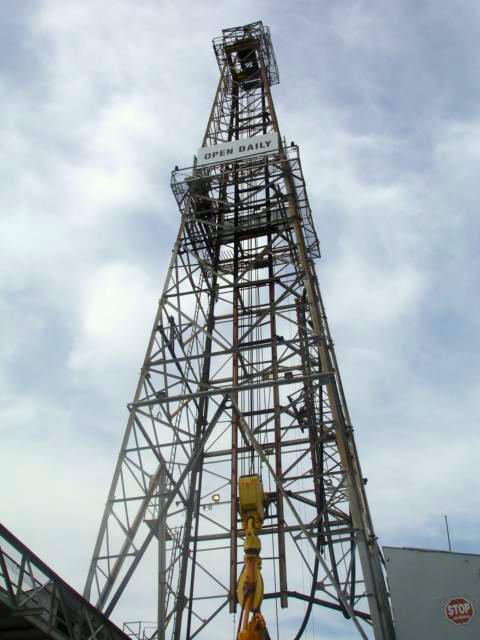
Iron oil derrick

3-D Representation of an oil derrick and pumpjack

Another kind of derrick is used on oil wells and other drilled holes. Both the structure itself and the complex set of machines associated with it are referred to as a derrick. A derrick is also used on some offshore oil and gas rigs.

== Patent systems ==
=== Hallen ===
The boom is connected with the lower part of the mast which is shaped like a "Y" or a bipod and therefore it is a single swinging derrick. On the cross trees, two guys are fastened using swivel outriggers which are stayed vertically and horizontally. In order to maintain a good controlling angle between guys and derrick, the outriggers cannot pass the inboard parallel of the centerline. The right outrigger stays in the centerline while the left outrigger moves outboard. This derrick will lower or heave cargo as both guys are veered or hauled. Three winches, controlled by joystick, are necessary to operate the Hallen derrick: two for the guys and one for the purchase. Limit switches are used to avoid an over-topping or over-swinging. However, the limits can be modified if a different working range or a special vertical stowage is required. The safe working load of the Hallen is between 10 and 80 tonnes. In a Hallen Universal derrick, which has no Hallen D-Frame, the halyard has an extended length since it runs through further blocks on the centerline. The Universal Hallen derrick, replacing the D-Frame option, is a kind of traditional topping lift. The Hallen D-Frame is a steel bracket welded on the mast in the centerline. For an observer standing a beam, the frame has a "D"-shape. The D-Frame supersedes the outriggers and provides a good controlling angle on the guys. The Hallen derrick is appropriate for, e.g., containers, logs, steel rail, sawn timber and heavy lifts. It does not lend itself to small, general cargo. It keeps the deck clear of guy ropes and preventors. Only one winchman is needed, and the Hallen can be brought into use within a few minutes. It is less expensive than a crane. A disadvantage is the low working range of the Hallen derrick; it is able to swing 75° from the centerline and can work against a list of up to 15°.

=== Velle ===
The Velle derrick is similar to the Hallen but without the use of outriggers. On top of the boom is a T-shaped yoke. As in the Hallen, the guys serve for topping and lowering the boom, but they are fastened on the yoke with four short, steel-wire hanger ropes. The ends of the topping and lowering ends of the halyard are secured to half-barrels on one winch. In this way the boom moves at the same speed as the winch veers the topping end of the halyard and hauls the lowering end of the halyard, and vice versa. The slewing ends are also wound on to another half-barrel. There is a third winch to hoist to cargo on the yoke. Runners decrease swing and rotation of the cargo. A joystick duplex controller steers the Velle derrick.

=== Stülcken ===
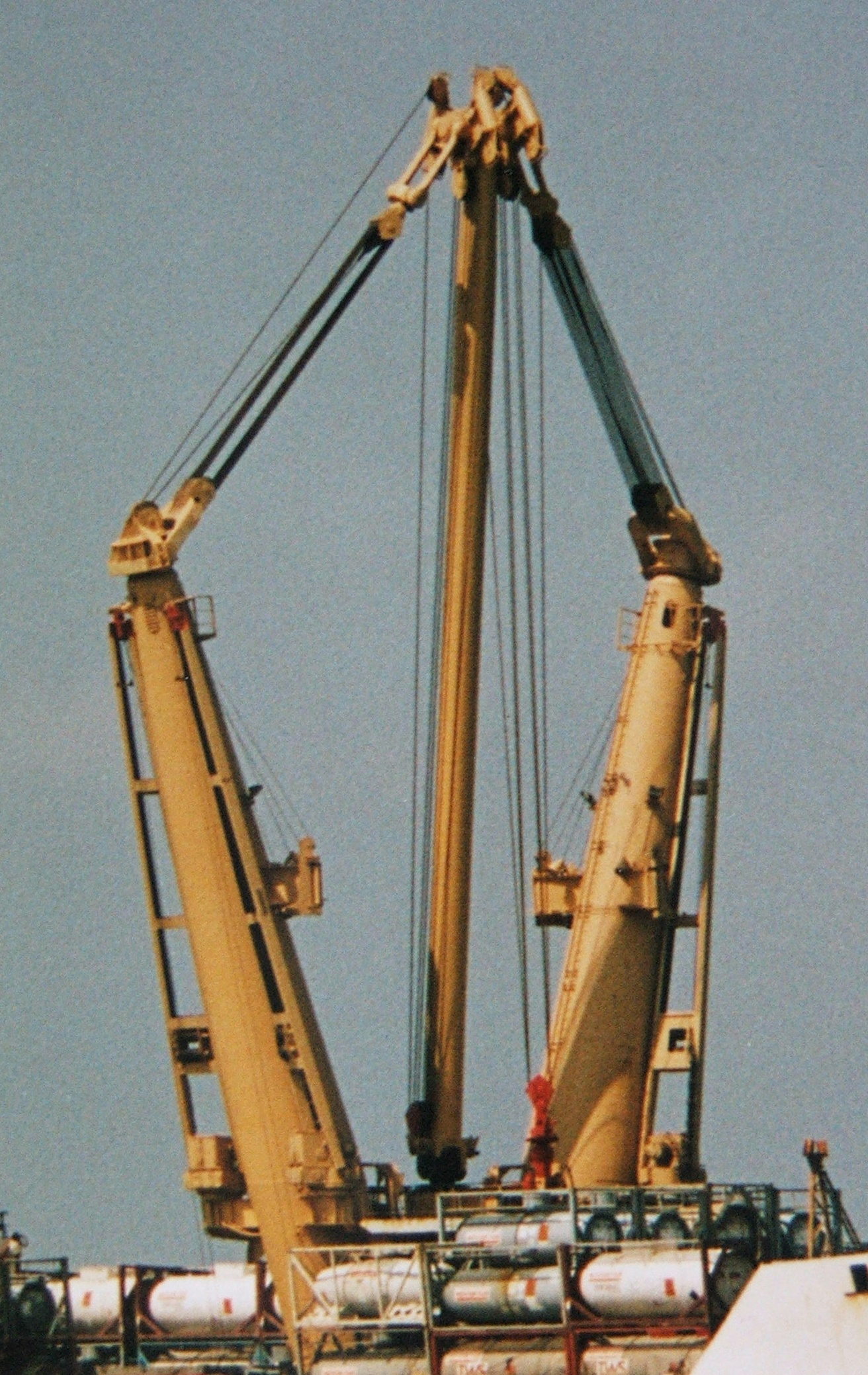
Stülcken heavy-lift derrick

The Stülcken derrick is used for heavy cargo. It stems from the German shipyard HC Stülcken & Sohn, later taken over by neighboring yard Blohm & Voss. This derrick can handle up to 300 tonnes. The Stülcken can be made ready in few minutes (faster than a traditional heavy derrick), does not require much space, and is operated by four winches. The Stülcken is secured between two V-shaped, unstayed Samson-posts. This makes it possible to let the derrick swing through the posts to reach another hatch. Each post has a hoisting winch, a span winch and a lever that is run by one man only. The span tackles are independent and the halyard is endless. With the revolving suspension heads on the posts it takes ten minutes to swing all the way through. In the double-pendulum block type, half of the cargo tackle can be anchored to the base of the boom. In order to double the hook speed, the halyard passes through the purchases since one end is secured, which reduces the safe working load by half. After the union table is detached, the double-pendulum block type of Stülcken is able to swing through, which allows the lower blocks to swing freely to each side of the boom. In this way the derrick can reach a vertical position. A bullrope pulls the derrick to the other side until the weight of the cargo tips the derrick over, so that the span tackles now have the weight on the other side. The union table is fixed again and the derrick can start work on the other side. There are also Stülcken with single-pendulum blocks. In this type the cargo hook is detached and the lower and upper cargo block are hauled into the center of the Stülcken. To tip the derrick over, gravity is used again.

== See also ==
- Crane
- Gyn
- Hoist
- Lighter
- Pumpjack
- Shear legs
