= Rebel 16 =

Sailboat class

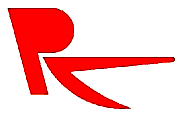

Development
- Designer: Ray Greene and Alvin Youngquist
- Location: United States
- Year: 1948
- No. built: over 4,000
- Builders: Ray Greene & Co; Melling Tool Company; Rebel Industries; Spindrift One Designs; Nickels Boat Works
- Role: One-design racer
- Name: Rebel 16

Boat
- Crew: minimum of two (racing)
- Displacement: 700 lb (318 kg)
- Draft: 3.50 ft (1.07 m) with the centreboard down

Hull
- Type: Monohull
- Construction: Fiberglass
- LOA: 16.10 ft (4.91 m)
- Beam: 6.62 ft (2.02 m)

Hull appendages
- Keel: centreboard
- Ballast: 110 lb (50 kg)
- Rudder: transom-mounted rudder

Rig
- Rig type: Bermuda rig
- I foretriangle height: 18.00 ft (5.49 m)
- J foretriangle base: 4.42 ft (1.35 m)
- P mainsail luff: 22.29 ft (6.79 m)
- E mainsail foot: 11.12 ft (3.39 m)

Sails
- Sailplan: Fractional rigged sloop Masthead sloop
- Mainsail area: 123.93 sq ft (11.513 m^{2})
- Jib/genoa area: 39.78 sq ft (3.696 m^{2})
- Total sail area: 163.71 sq ft (15.209 m^{2})

Racing
- D-PN: 97.2

The Rebel 16 is an American sailing dinghy that was designed by Ray Greene and Alvin Youngquist as a one-design racer and first built in 1948.

The design was the first production fiberglass boat.

== Production ==
The design was initially built by Ray Greene & Co in the United States with 25 sold in the first year, but the company went out of business in 1975, when Ray Greene retired. The boat was built by the Melling Tool Company, Rebel Industries and Spindrift One Designs before production by Nickels Boat Works. That company merged with Windrider in 2015 and it is no longer advertised on their website as being in production.

== Design ==
The Rebel 16 is a recreational sailboat, built predominantly of fiberglass with some areas with balsa or foam cores. It has a fractional sloop rig with a rotating mast and hard-coated aluminum spars. The hull has a spooned plumb stem, a vertical transom, a kick-up, transom-hung rudder controlled by a tiller and a retractable steel centerboard. The hull has a full foredeck and full-length seats that can accommodate eight people. The class plans show the design with sheer, while the manufacturer's drawings lack the sheer. The boat displaces 700 lb (318 kg) and carries 110 lb (50 kg) of ballast, in form of the steel centerboard.

The boat has a draft of 3.50 ft (1.07 m) with the centerboard extended and 6 in (15 cm) with it retracted, allowing beaching or ground transportation on a trailer.

For safety the design is equipped with foam buoyancy flotation under the seats and in the bow. It features adjustable jib tracks. Factory options included a mast rotation bar, a boom vang, a Cunningham, a whisker pole and built-in cockpit bailers, as well as hiking straps.

The design has a Portsmouth Yardstick racing average handicap of 97.2 and is normally raced with a crew of at least two sailors.

== Variants ==
Rebel
Original model
Rebel II
This model has narrower side decks and a correspondingly wider cockpit

== Operational history ==
The design has an active class club, the Rebel Class Association.

In a 1994 review Richard Sherwood wrote, the "Rebel was the first production sailboat built in fiberglass. Acceptance was fast, and there have been annual national regattas since 1951"

A 2008 staff report in Sailing Magazine termed it a "tough but nimble little classic".

== See also ==
- List of sailing boat types
