= GYN =

GYN may refer to:

- Gyn, a lifting device on sailing ships
- Guyanese Creole
- Gynaecology
- Santa Genoveva Airport, serving Goiânia, Brazil
