= Gin pole =

Supported pole with a pulley on the end, used to lift heavy objects

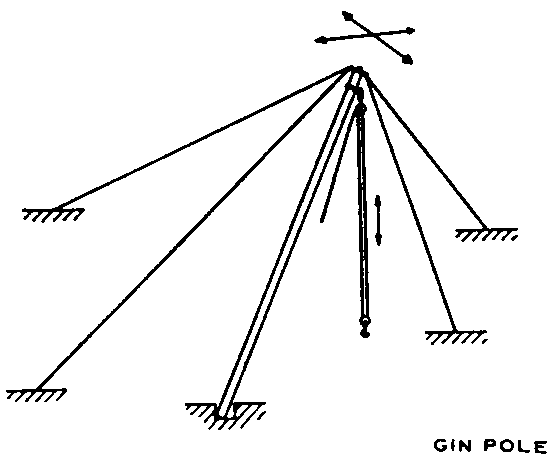
Diagram of gin pole

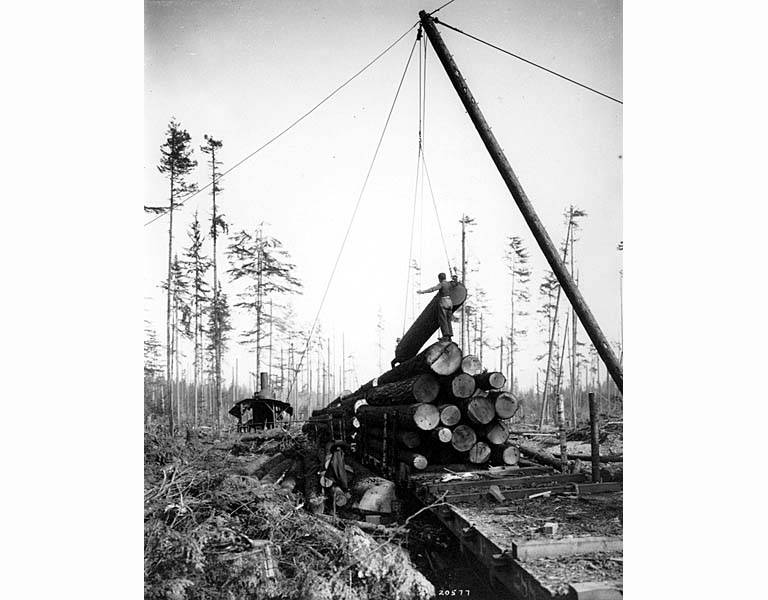
A gin pole in use loading logs

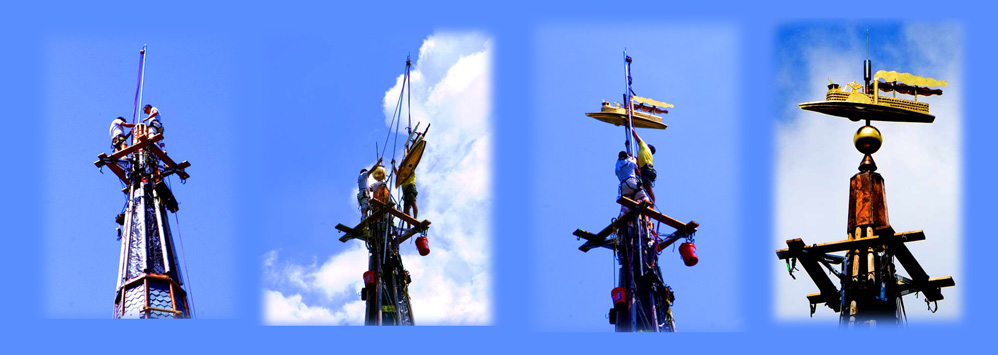
A gin pole used to install a weather vane atop the 200-foot steeple of a church

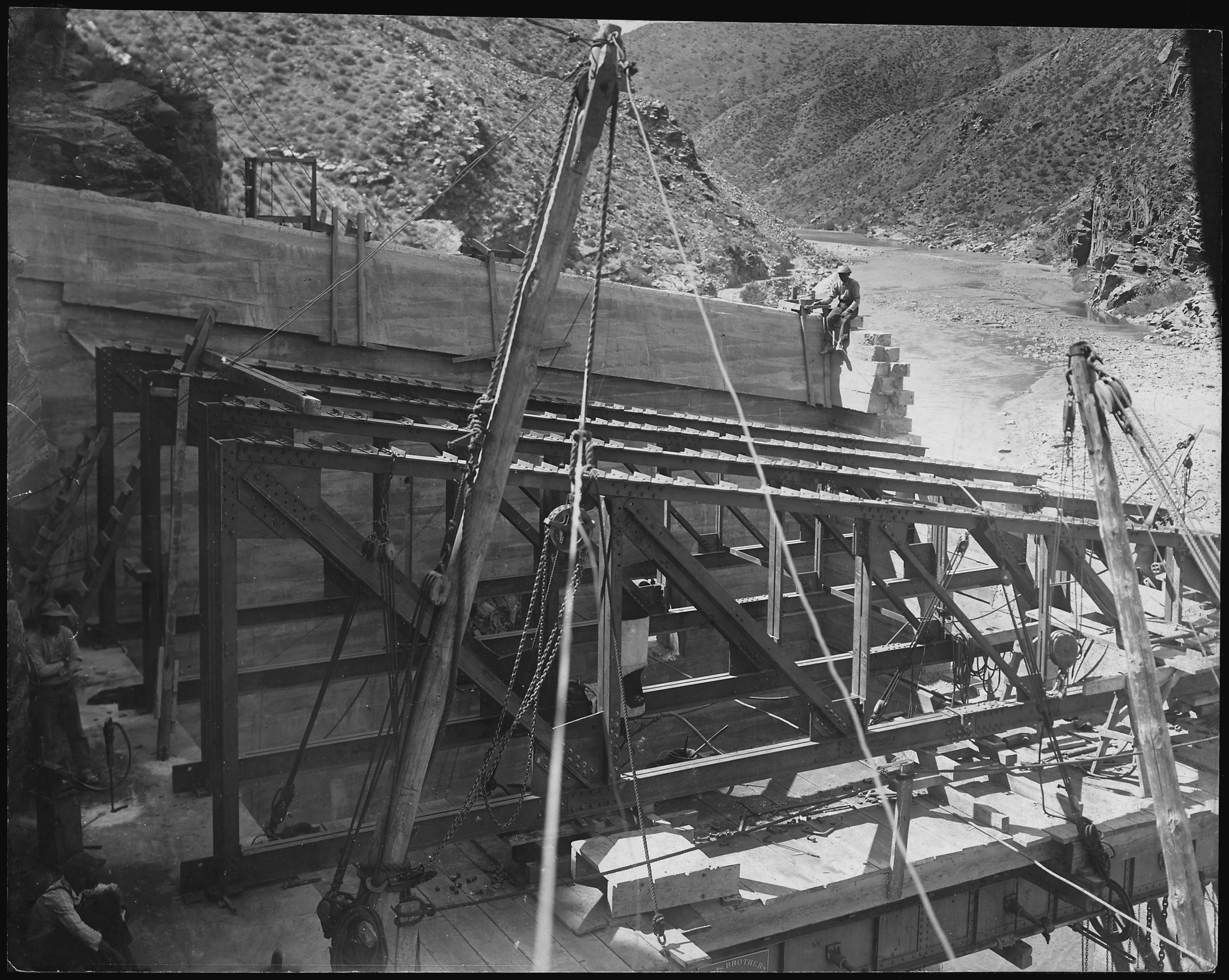
Roof trusses being assembled with gin poles

A gin pole is a pivoting mast supported by one or more guy-wires (also known simply as guys) that uses a pulley or block and tackle mounted on its upper end to lift loads. The lower end is braced or set in a shallow hole and positioned so the upper end lies above the object to be lifted. The pole (also known as a mast, boom, or spar) is secured with three or more guys. These are manipulated to move the load laterally, with up and down controlled by the pulley or block. In tower construction, a gin pole can also be “jumped” up the completed sections of a tower to lift the higher sections into place.

== Etymology ==
The gin pole is derived from a gyn, and considered a form of derrick, called a standing derrick or pole derrick, distinguished from sheers (or shear legs) by having a single boom rather than a two-legged one.

== Applications ==
In addition to being used as simple lifting devices in field operations such as construction, logging, loading and unloading boats, and emergency repairs, gin poles are well suited to raising loads above structures too tall to reach with a crane, such as placing an antenna on top of a tower/steeple, and to lift segments of a tower on top of one another during erection. When used to create a segmented tower, the gin pole can be detached, raised, and re-attached to the just-completed segment in order to lift the next. This process of jumping is repeated until the topmost portion of the tower is completed. They can also hold a person if strong enough (thus opening stage uses, such as in magic shows).

Gin poles are mounted on trucks as a primitive form of mobile crane, used in combination with a typically front-mounted winch for lifting and relocating loads, and in salvage operations in lieu of a more capable wrecker.
