= Downhaul =

The downhaul is a line which is part of the rigging on a sailboat; it applies downward force on a spar or sail. The most common downhaul on a modern sailboat is attached to the spinnaker pole, though this may be referred to as the foreguy in some rigging nomenclature. The term is also commonly applied to the cunningham on the mainsail.

In a windsurfing rig, the downhaul is the primary load-bearing line which controls the sail's shape. Modern windsurfing sails incorporate a sleeve for the mast, and therefore do not have a halyard which tensions the top of the sail. The downhaul is tensioned early in the rigging process and is generally not adjustable on the water, and is therefore rather different in use than the downhaul on a sailboat.
