= Block (sailing) =

Sailing term; single or multiple pulley

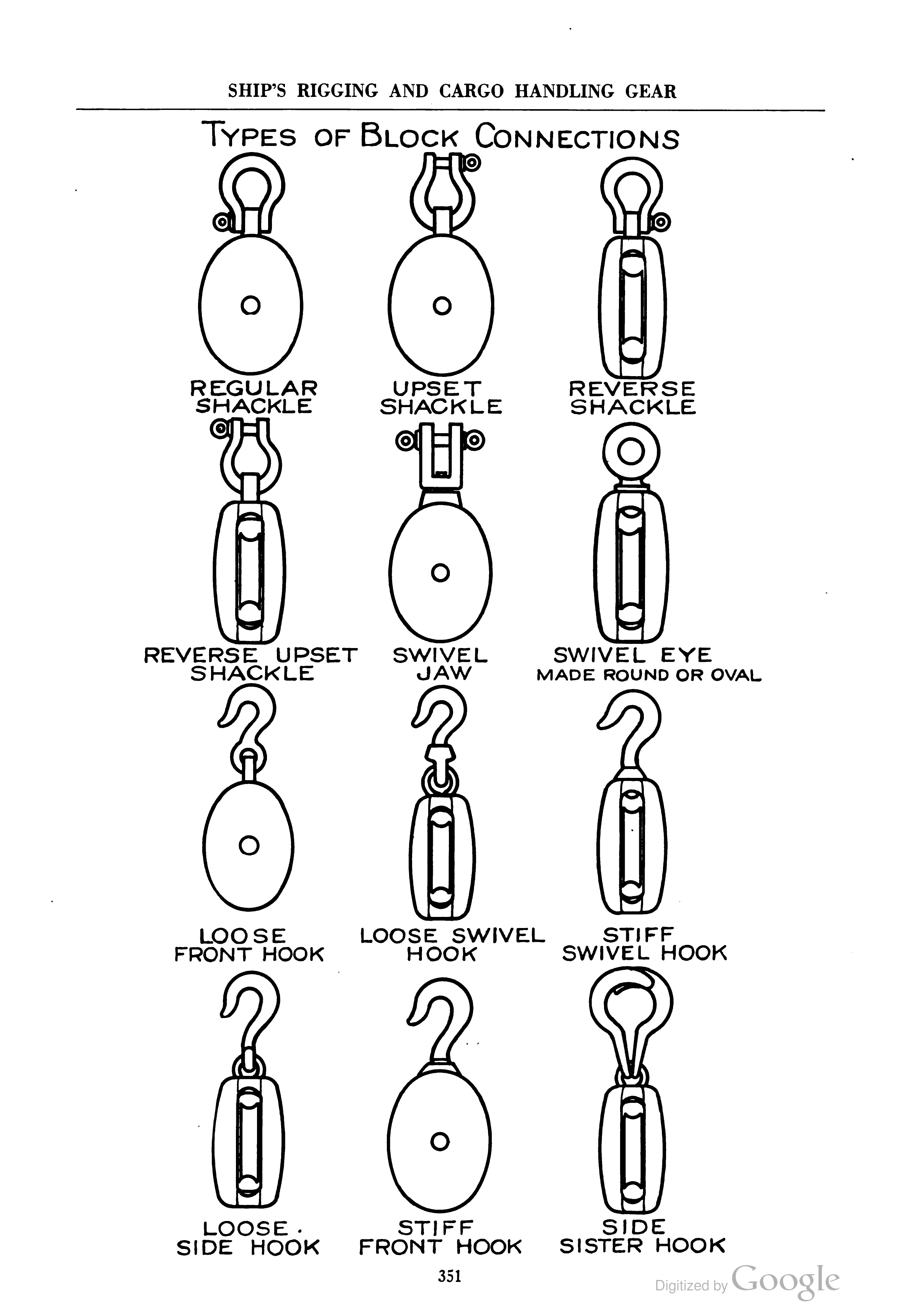
Several different types of block connections as used on sailing ships, including the regular shackle, upset shackle, reverse shackle, reverse upset shackle, swivel jaw, swivel eye made round or oval, loose front hook, loose swivel hook, stiff swivel hook, loose side hook, stiff front hook, and side sister hook.

In sailing, a block is a single or multiple pulley. One or a number of sheaves are enclosed in an assembly between cheeks or chocks. In use, a block is fixed to the end of a line, to a spar, or to a surface. A line (rope) is reeved through the sheaves, and maybe through one or more matching blocks at some far end, to make up a tackle.

The purchase of a tackle refers to its mechanical advantage. In general the more sheaves in the blocks that make up a tackle, the higher its mechanical advantage. The matter is slightly complicated by the fact that every tackle has a working end where the final run of rope leaves the last sheave. More mechanical advantage can be obtained if this end is attached to the moving load rather than the fixed end of the tackle.

There are various types of blocks that are used in sailing. Some blocks are used to increase mechanical advantage and others are used simply to change the direction of a line. A ratchet block turns freely when a line is pulled in one direction but does not turn the other direction, although the line may slip past the sheave. This kind of block makes a loaded line easier to hold by hand, and is sometimes used on smaller boats for lines like main and jib sheets that are frequently adjusted.

A single, large, sail-powered warship in the mid-19th century required more than 1,400 blocks of various kinds.

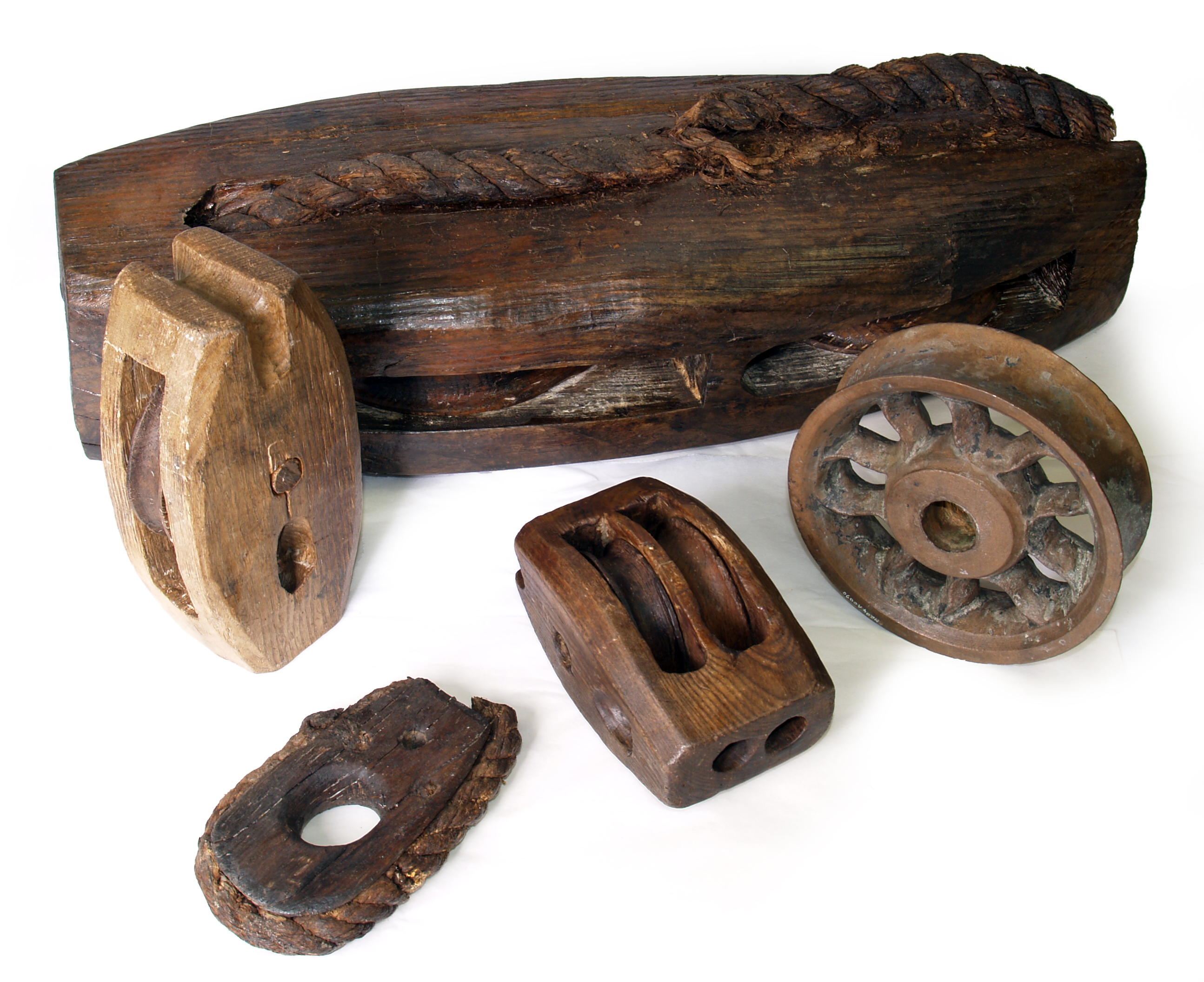
Various types of blocks of both wood and metal found on the 16th century ship Mary Rose

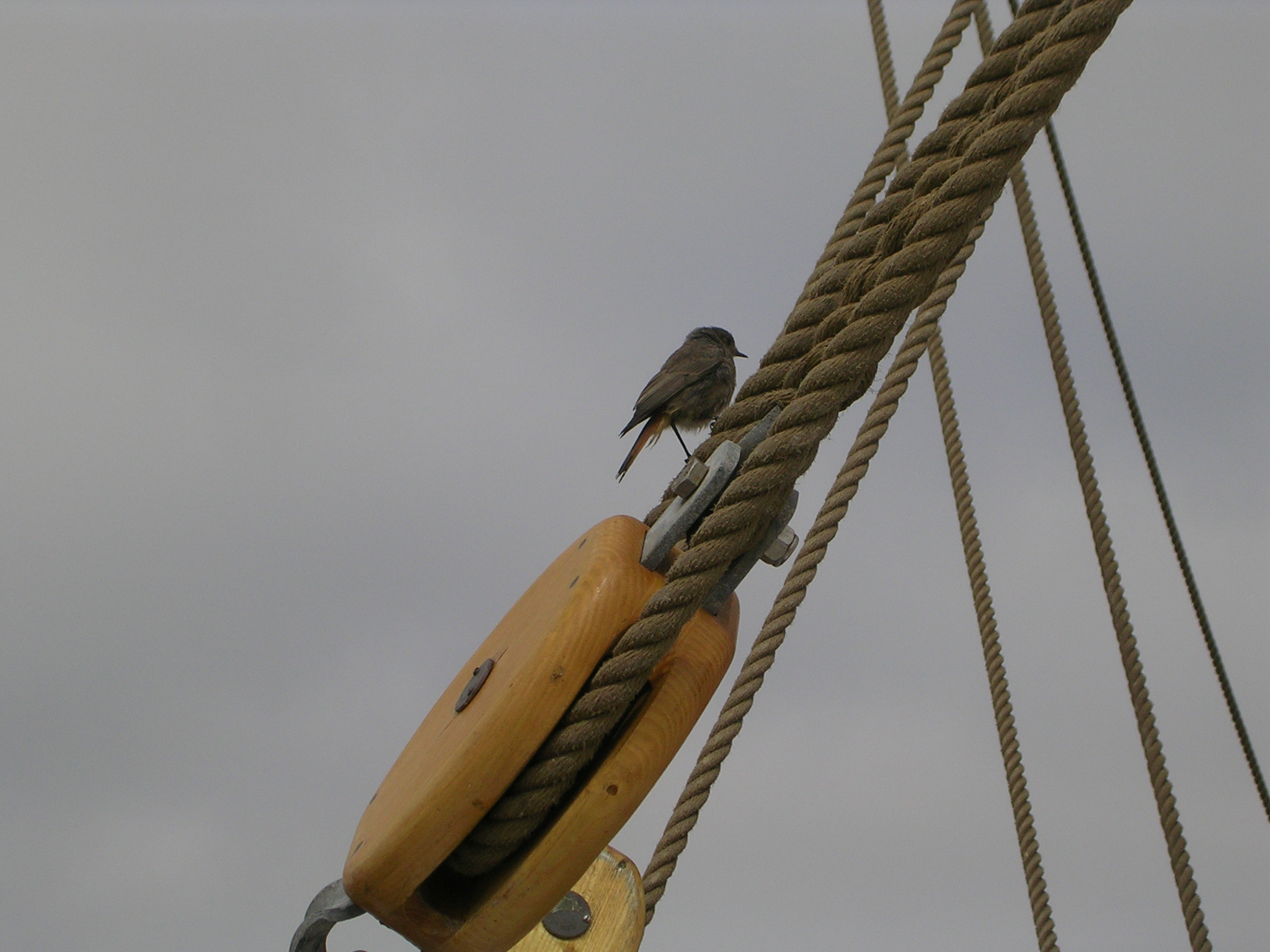
A bird perched near a wooden block

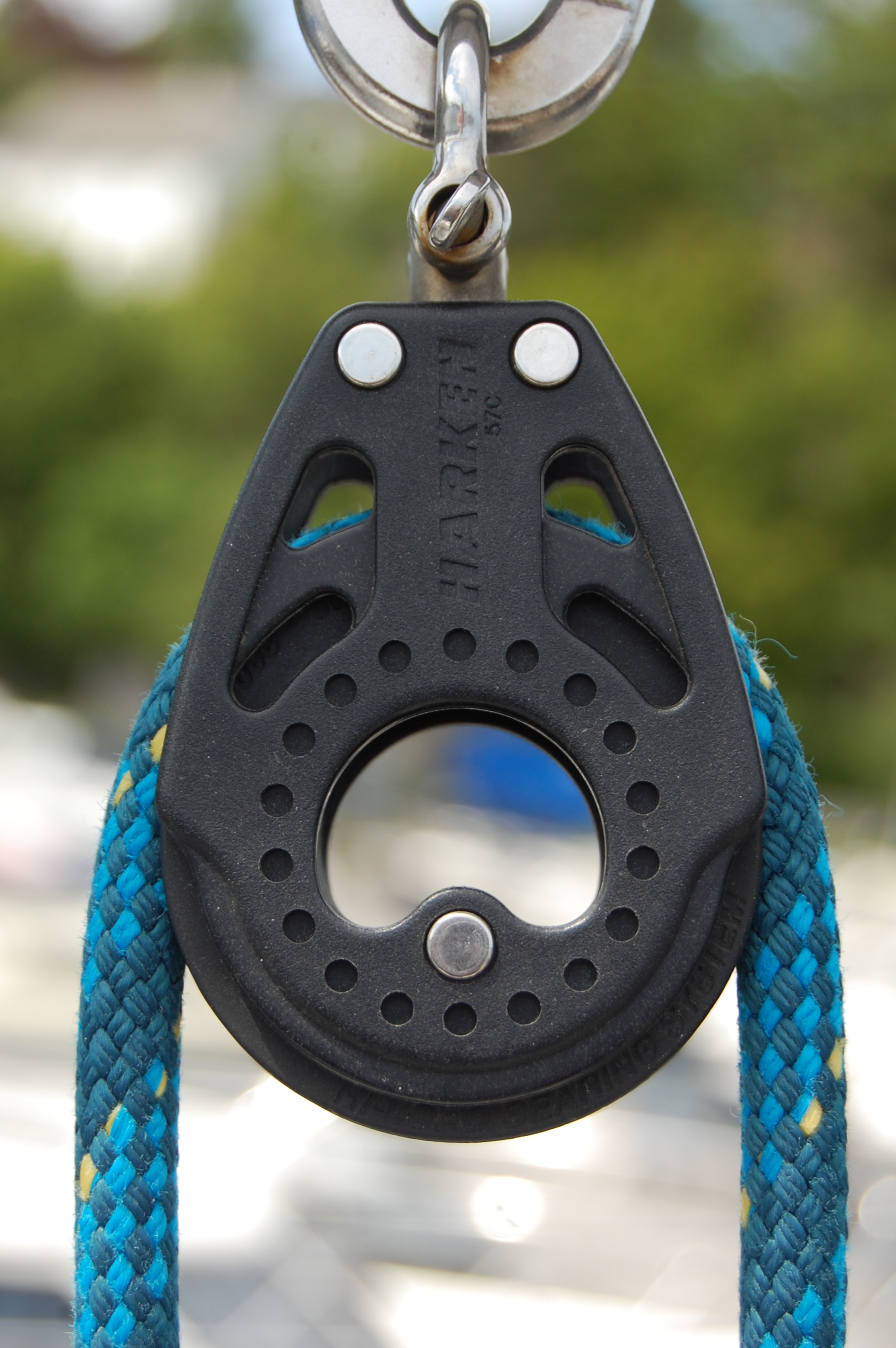
A modern single block made of stainless steel and reinforced plastic. The ball bearing is made of Delrin (polyoxymethylene)

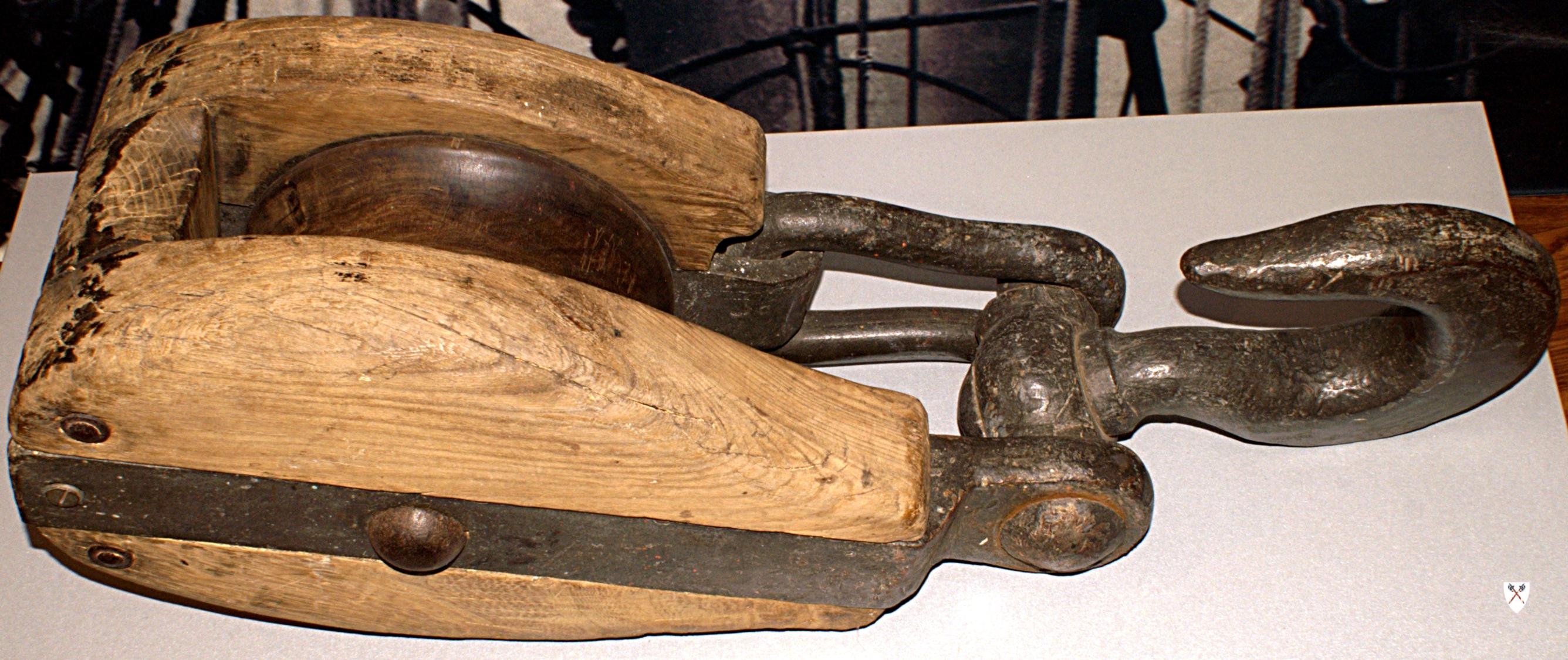
Snatch block with wood cheeks and sheave

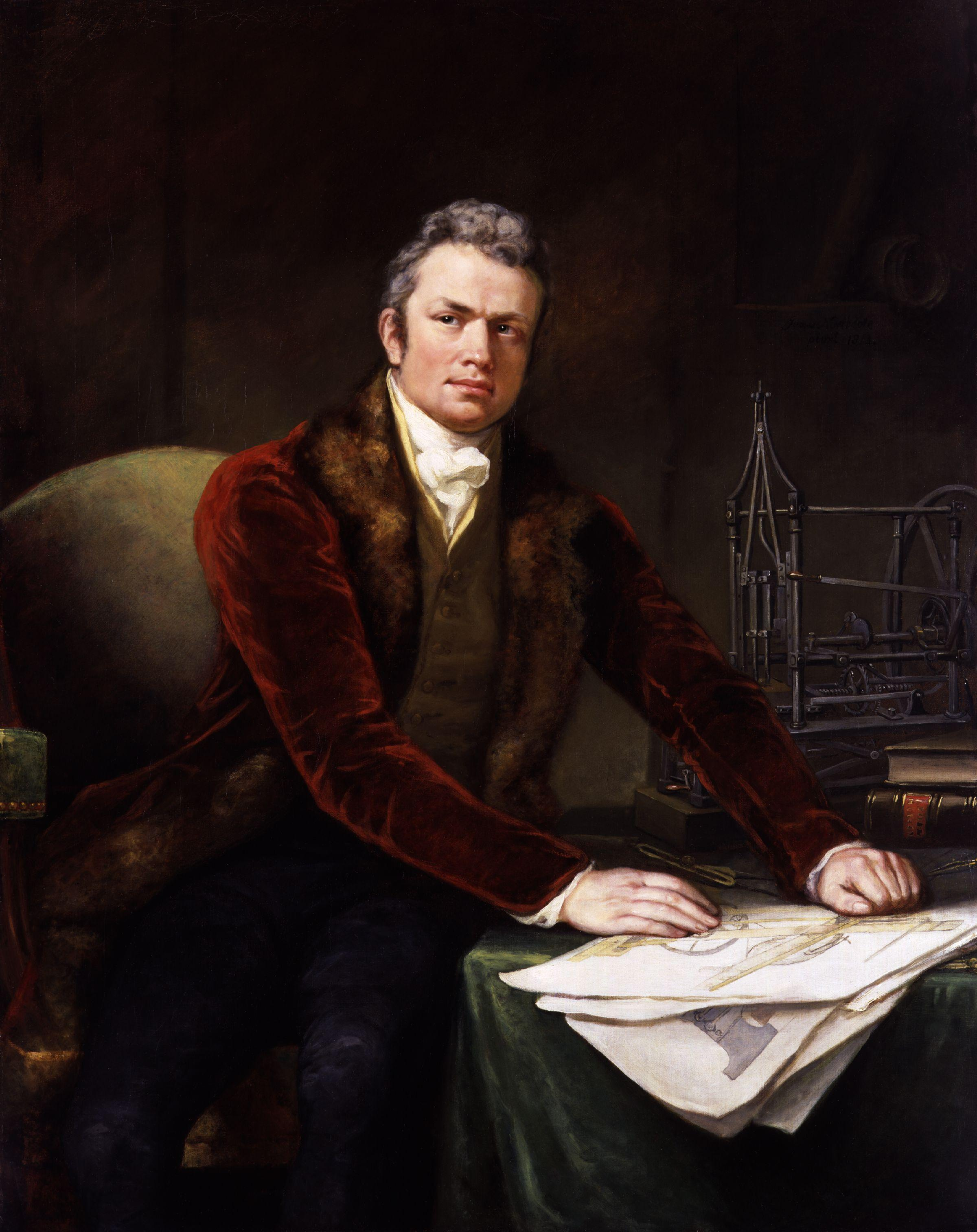
Portrait of Marc Isambard Brunel, 1813, with a model of his block-making machine in the background.

== Sailing terms in everyday English ==
Chock a' block
Refers literally to the situation where pulling on the working line will not raise the load any further because the cheeks of one lifting block are already against the other. Figuratively this has come to mean that something is as full or as close as it can be.

== See also ==
- Block and tackle
- Two six heave
- Portsmouth Block Mills
- Pulley
