= Brail =

Line used to haul in the leech of a sail

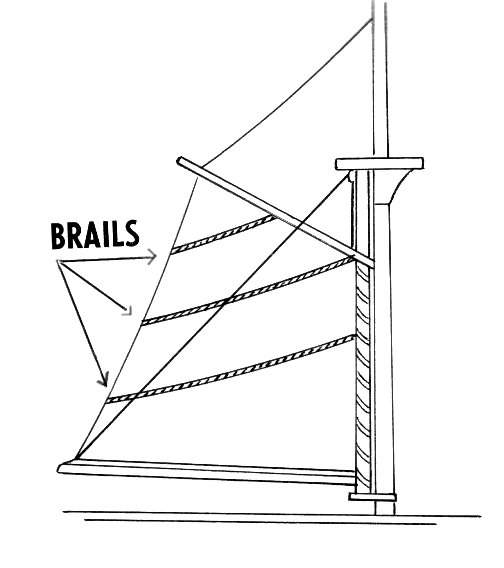

Brails, in a sailing ship, are small lines used to haul in or up the edges (leeches) or corners of sails, before furling. On a ship rig, these brails are most often found on the mizzen sail. To haul and furl the sails, the command used in the early 18th century was hale up the brails or brail up the sails.

The word brail comes from Middle English brayle, from Anglo-French braiel belt, strap, brail, alteration of Old French braiuel belt, probably ultimately from Latin braca pant.

A brail net is a type of net incorporating brail lines on a small fishing net on a boat or castnet. A brail net used for casting is also referred to as an English net as opposed to a Spanish net.

== See also ==
- Clewlines and buntlines – Ropes used to handle sails of a ship
- Reefing – Reducing the area of a sail
- Guy (sailing) – Rope to control the end of a spar on a sailboat
