= Gyn =

Improvised 3-legged lifting device used on sailing ships

A gyn is an improvised three-legged lifting device used on sailing ships. It provides more stability than a derrick or sheers, and requires no rigging for support. Without additional support, however, it can only be used for lifting things directly up and down. Gyns may also be used to support either end of a ropeway.

Two legs, called cheeks, are bound together as in the sheerlegs, with the third spar, called the prypole, and is fixed under the cheek lashing to form the apex of the tripod. Alternately, a tripod lashing may be used to form the tripod, with the heel of the center spar pointing in the opposite direction of the cheeks to ensure a solid apex when raised. Only four tackles are required; three as 'splay tackles' to prevent the legs of the tripod from spreading, with the fourth tackle as lifting purchase. A timber hitch, six figure-of-eight turns, and a finishing clove hitch lash the cheeks into a crutch but not too tight because the cheeks need some room to spread their heels. The cheeks of the gyn are now ready to spread and to be erected. The cheek splay tackle is hauled tight and then the two adjacent prypole splay tackles can be rigged and hauled as apex of the gyn is raised. At the sides, the gyn is unstable and it is crucial that the cargo is not swung out of the base triangle; consequently the gyn is only for lifting cargo vertically.

British Army artillery gunners used apparatus such as 'Bell's gyn' designed by John Bell (artillerist) or the 'Gibraltar gyn' for lifting artillery pieces.

Gyns have also been used on land as part of the equipment to help assist water being pumped out of water wells in the Sinai Peninsula.

== See also ==
- Gin pole
