= Guy (sailing) =

Rope to control the end of a spar on a sailboat

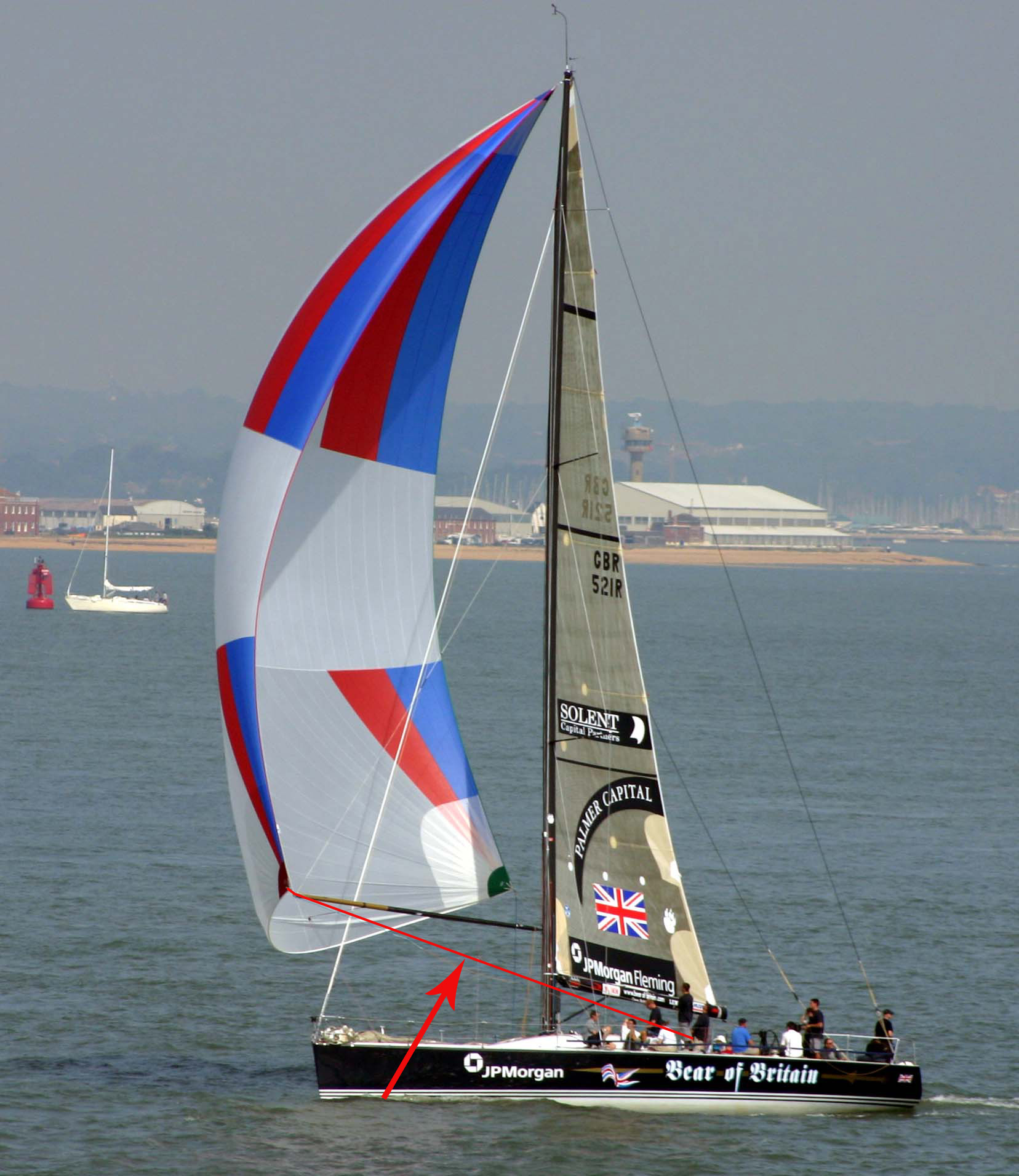
Guy (red arrow), controlling the spinnaker pole.

A guy (probably from Dutch gei, "brail") is a line (rope) attached to and intended to control the end of a spar on a sailboat. On a modern sloop-rigged sailboat with a symmetric spinnaker, the spinnaker pole is the spar most commonly controlled by one or more guys.

== Types ==
There are two primary types of guys used to control a spinnaker pole:

- The afterguy, working guy, or simply guy and sometimes known as a brace is attached to the windward clew of the spinnaker, and runs through the jaws on the outboard end of the pole and back to the cockpit. The afterguy is used to rotate the outboard end of the pole around the mast in order to optimize the sail's effectiveness, depending on the direction of the wind. Because a spinnaker has two clews, there is always a second line identical to the afterguy attached to the leeward clew of the spinnaker. This is called the sheet and serves a slightly different function. When the boat jibes, the spinnaker pole will be moved from one side of the boat to the other, causing the sheet to become the guy and vice versa.
- A foreguy may also be used to control the height of the spinnaker pole. It is attached either to the end of the pole or to a bridle on the bottom of the pole, and runs through a padeye on the foredeck rather than directly aft to the cockpit. The foreguy is used to keep the end of the pole from lifting up under heavy wind. In addition, it can be used to change the shape of the spinnaker slightly to make the sail more efficient. The foreguy may be referred to as a downhaul if it is attached to a bridle at the pole's midpoint, but this term is used for other parts of a boat's rigging as well.

== See also ==
- Guy-wire – Tensioned cable designed to add stability to a freestanding structure
- Aeronautical wire bracing – Structural members to stiffen and strengthen airframe
- Stays (nautical) – Standing rigging supporting a mast
