= Lashing (ropework) =

Way of fastening two or more items together with rope

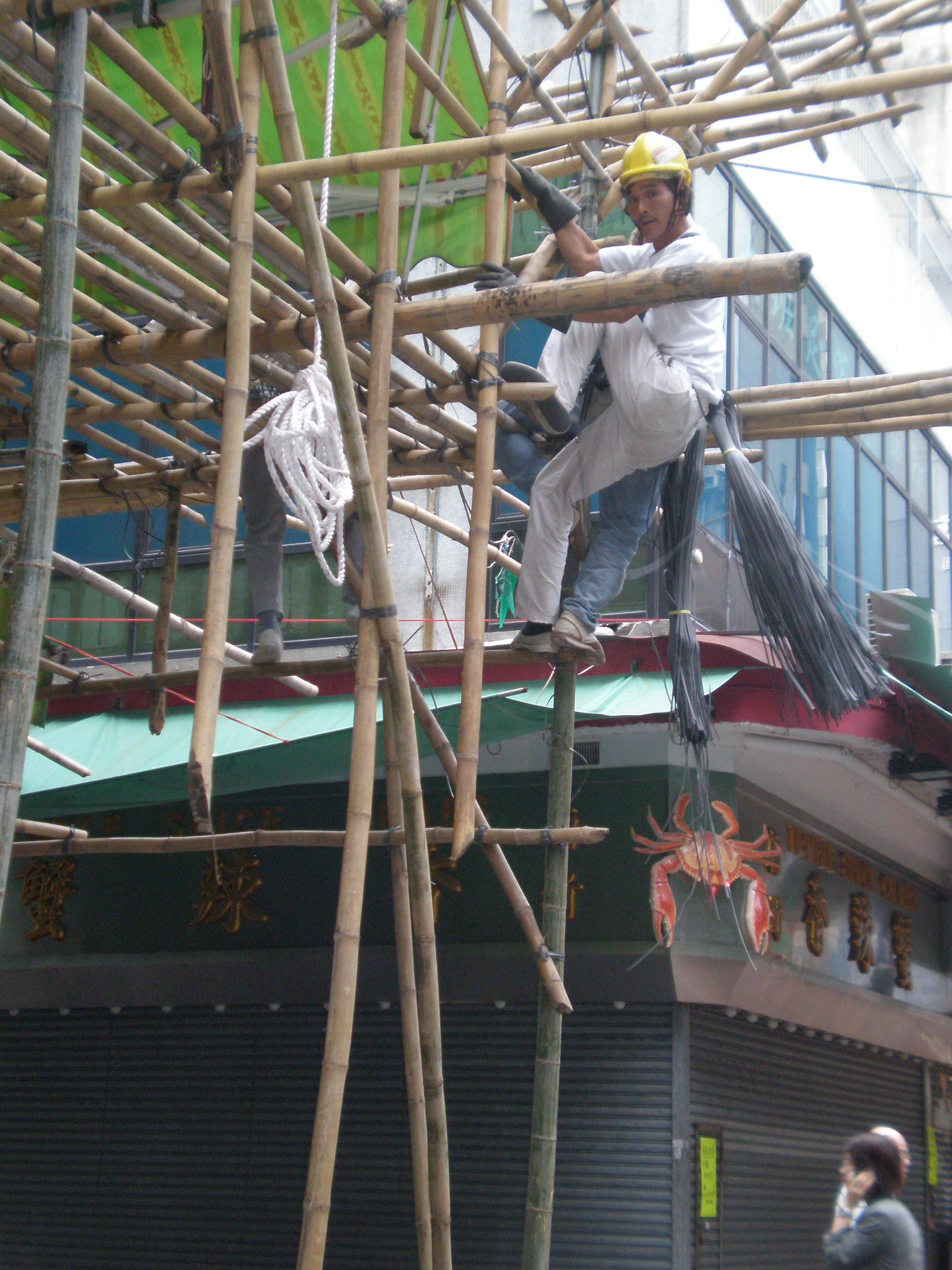
Bamboo scaffolding secured with lashings in Kowloon.

A lashing is an arrangement of rope, wire, or webbing with linking device used to secure and fasten two or more items together in a somewhat rigid manner. Lashings are most commonly applied to timber poles, and are commonly associated with cargo, containerization, the Scouting movement, sailors, and gardeners.

In its most basic sense, lashing is about attaching two poles (or spars) together. It consists of "wraps", winding the rope around the poles, and "fraps", winding the rope between the poles and around the wraps to tighten them.

It has been imagined that the first lashing made by humans was wrapping a few strips of bark around a stone to hold it to a tree branch to make an ax to hunt and build with. In modern times, the same methods are used, but strips of bark and vines have been replaced with natural and synthetic fiber ropes. Scouts and campers use lashings to build camp gadgets and improve their campsites for comfort and convenience, including the building of rafts for transport and competitive events. Lashings are also used in pioneering, the art of creating structures such as bridges and towers, using ropes and wooden spars.

There are still areas in the world where lashing spars (or poles) is the basic means of building.

== Types ==
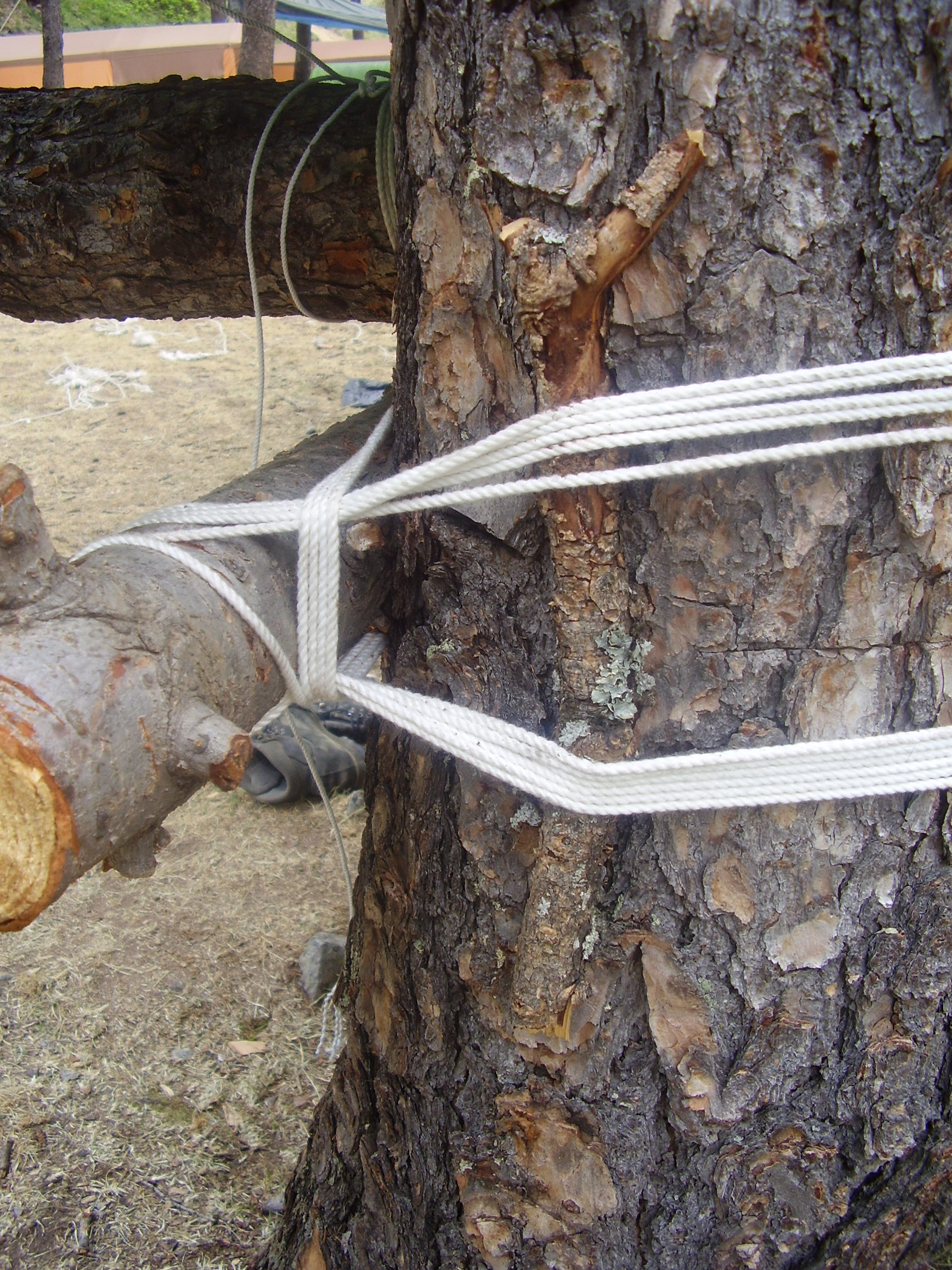
A square lashing binding a wooden spar to a tree trunk. The rope turns between the tree and spar are the frapping.

=== Square lashing ===
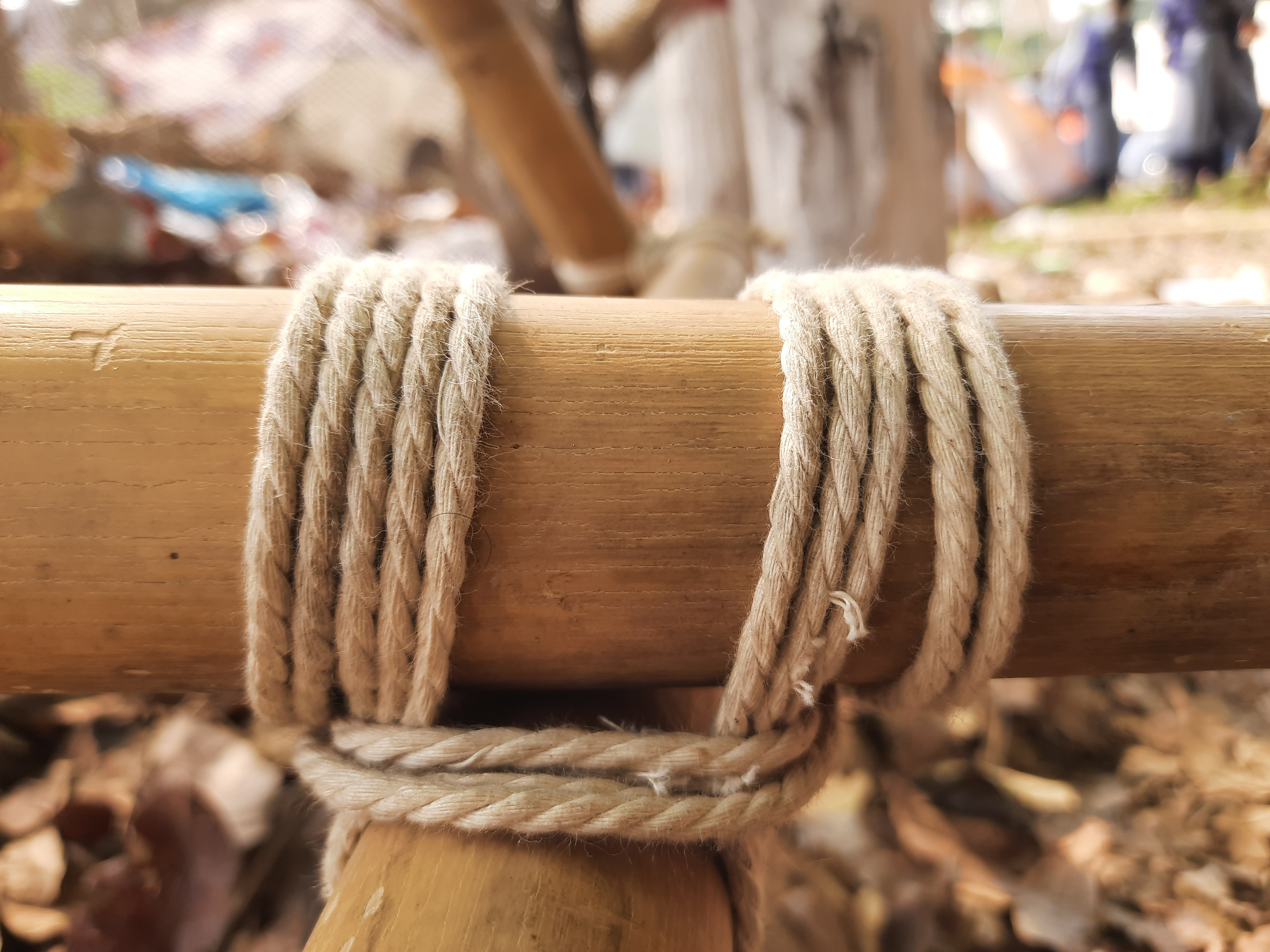
Square Lashing

Square lashing is a type of lashing used to bind spars together, at right angles to one another. There are different types, but all consist of a series of wraps around the spars, and frapping around the line running between the spars.

=== Diagonal lashing ===
Diagonal lashing is a type of lashing used to bind spars or poles together, to prevent racking. It gets its name from the fact that the wrapping turns cross the poles diagonally and is used to spring poles together where they do not touch as in the X-brace of a trestle.

=== Shear lashing ===
Shear lashing (two-spar shear lashing; also spelled "sheer lashing") is used for lashing together two parallel spars which will be opened out of the parallel to form sheer legs as in the formation of an A-frame. The clove hitch is tied around one leg only and frapping turns are taken between the poles.

=== Round lashing ===
The round lashing is most frequently used to join two poles together to extend their length. Typically, two lashings are used a reasonable distance apart for extra strength. In the simple version, a clove hitch is tied around both poles and there are no frapping turns.

The nautical term gammon means a round lashing of rope or iron hardware to attach a mast to a boat or ship.

=== Tripod lashing ===
The tripod lashing is used to join three spars together to form a self supporting structure. Two structures can be used to support a crossbar or platform. Other names are gyn lashing, figure of eight lashing, and three-spar shear lashing. If the lashing is tied around three spars, then the structure is called a tripod, but quadpods can also be made by using four spars.

== See also ==
- Binding knot
- D-ring
- List of knots
