= Two, six, heave =

Phrase used to coordinate team pulling

"Two, six, heave" is a phrase used to coordinate seamen's pulling.

As used by sailors, the person at the front of the team will typically call out the "two, six" part of the chant. During this phase all members move their hands up the line ready to pull. This is followed, in its natural rhythm, by the "heave", called out by the whole team together. At this moment, the team simultaneously lean back on the line, and use their leg muscles to exert a powerful pull upon it. This coordination takes some practice to achieve, but the difference in applied power between a raw group pulling as individuals and a practiced team hauling together is very significant.

There is not a single tempo or cadence for the chant, since this will depend on the task in hand. For example, hauling in the upper topsail halyard will require a long, heavy pull; if the team is not to be exhausted halfway through then the leader must ensure that the pace is slow enough to be maintained throughout the job. Hauling in a clewline, by contrast, is relatively quick and easy, so the chant can be quite rapid. It is also not always necessary to use this method of hauling for the whole of a task; often, the first part of the job can be achieved with simple hand-over-hand pulling, switching over to a coordinated heave for the final tensioning.

After a line on a ship has been hauled taut, it will usually be secured to a belaying pin.

In Britain it has a broader meaning and is often used in any situation where a coordinated pulling effort is required, often where maritime people are involved, but almost as frequently where 'civilians' are working together.

== History ==
The phrase "two, six, heave" is relatively modern, variations not appearing in print until 1911 (as "wan [one] - two - six - pull"), and again in 1925 as "one, two... six - heave!".

The phrase was not considered a specifically nautical or naval term until 1951 (appearing as "one, two, six, heave!"). The exact phrase "two... six... heave" without the leading "one" first appeared in 1952, referring to its use in railway construction in Sumatran prisoner-of-war camps in 1942.

The year 1968 marked the first use of the exact phrase "two, six - heave" as a nautical or naval term. Remarkably, the subject of the 1968 article was a number of theories about the origin of "two, six, heave". It also contains the first appearance of the popular unconfirmed theory that the phrase originated from Royal Navy gunners numbered 2 and 6, who supposedly, on this command, hauled the gun back for reloading.

More familiar numeric ordering, "one, two, three, heave", has been in continuous use since as early as 1836. A variation from The Lost Ship, 1840, is described thus: " “Steady lads, steady...wait till I give you the words — one, two, three, and then at the third, pull all together... Now then - one, two, three - pull" ".

== Origin theories ==
It is widely believed to derive from the orders used in firing shipboard cannon in Britain's Royal Navy. According to this story, the team of six gunners had numbered roles. After loading, it was the task of the men numbered two and six to heave (in a coordinated fashion) the cannon out the gunport for firing, using simple effort for a light cannon or a tackle apiece for larger ones. There are a number of problems with this theory, however: firstly, two men would be insufficient to haul out a gun, which could weigh in excess of two and a half tons. Secondly, numbers two and six would be on the same side of the gun (even numbers being on one side and odd numbers on the other). Thirdly, there is no reference to the phrase in any literature prior to the First World War, making it highly unlikely that it was in use before this time.

People in the square rigged sailing community have proposed the idea that it could be a shortening of the French “tout de suite”, often anglicised colloquially to "toot sweet", which means 'immediately'. There has also been conjecture that it was originally the French, "toutes six houle" (all six heave) but what "six" is unclear as there is no evidence it was orders to a gun crew.
