= Spinnaker pole =

Sailboat rigging component

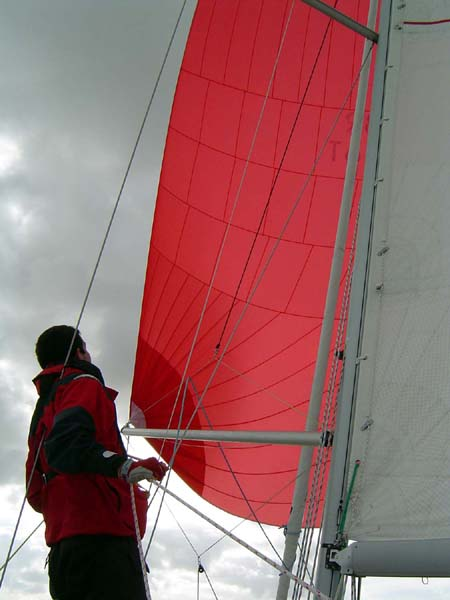
A spinnaker pole being used to set a conventional symmetric spinnaker

A spinnaker pole is a spar used in sailboats (both dinghies and yachts) to help support and control a variety of headsails, particularly the spinnaker. It is also used with other sails, such as genoas and jibs, when sailing downwind with no spinnaker hoisted, sometimes using a special light spinnaker pole called a whisker pole, possible since the load on the pole is very light on this point of sail.

== Rigging ==
The spinnaker pole is rigged to run from the base of the mast, where there is a special fitting for attaching one end of the pole, out to windward over the side of the boat. There, one of the control lines of whichever sail it is to be used with is run through a fitting on the other end of the spinnaker pole. This allows for more precise control of the corner of the sail to which the line is attached.

For a spinnaker, the line attached to the pole is the guy, or brace, and the corner is the tack. For other headsails, such as a jib, the line would be the sheet, attached to the clew.

An uphaul is a line run from the middle of the spinnaker pole up to a block on the mast, and is used to support the weight of the spinnaker pole. A downhaul or foreguy runs down so that the height of the pole is under positive control at all times.
