= Rigging =

Ropes, cables and chains which support masts of sailing ships

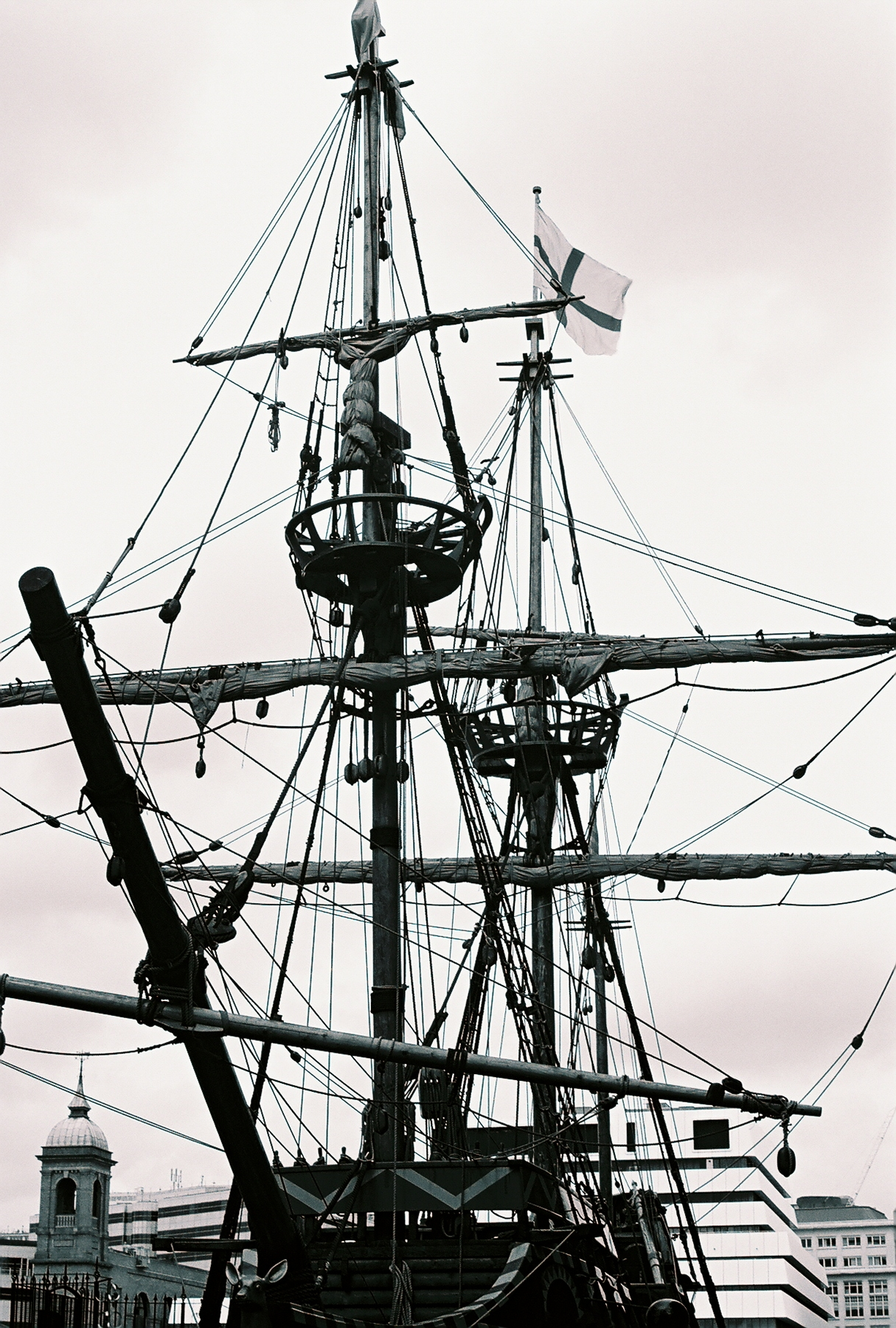
The rigging of a square rigger in London.

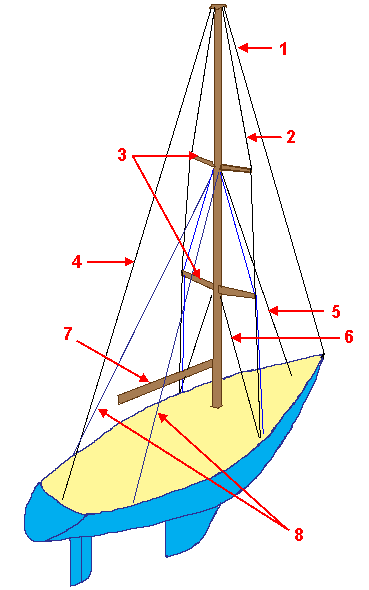
Standing rigging on a fore-and-aft rigged sailboat. Key: 1. Forestay 2. Shroud 3. (Spreaders) 4. Backstay 5. Inner forestay 6. Sidestay 7. (Boom) 8. Running backstays

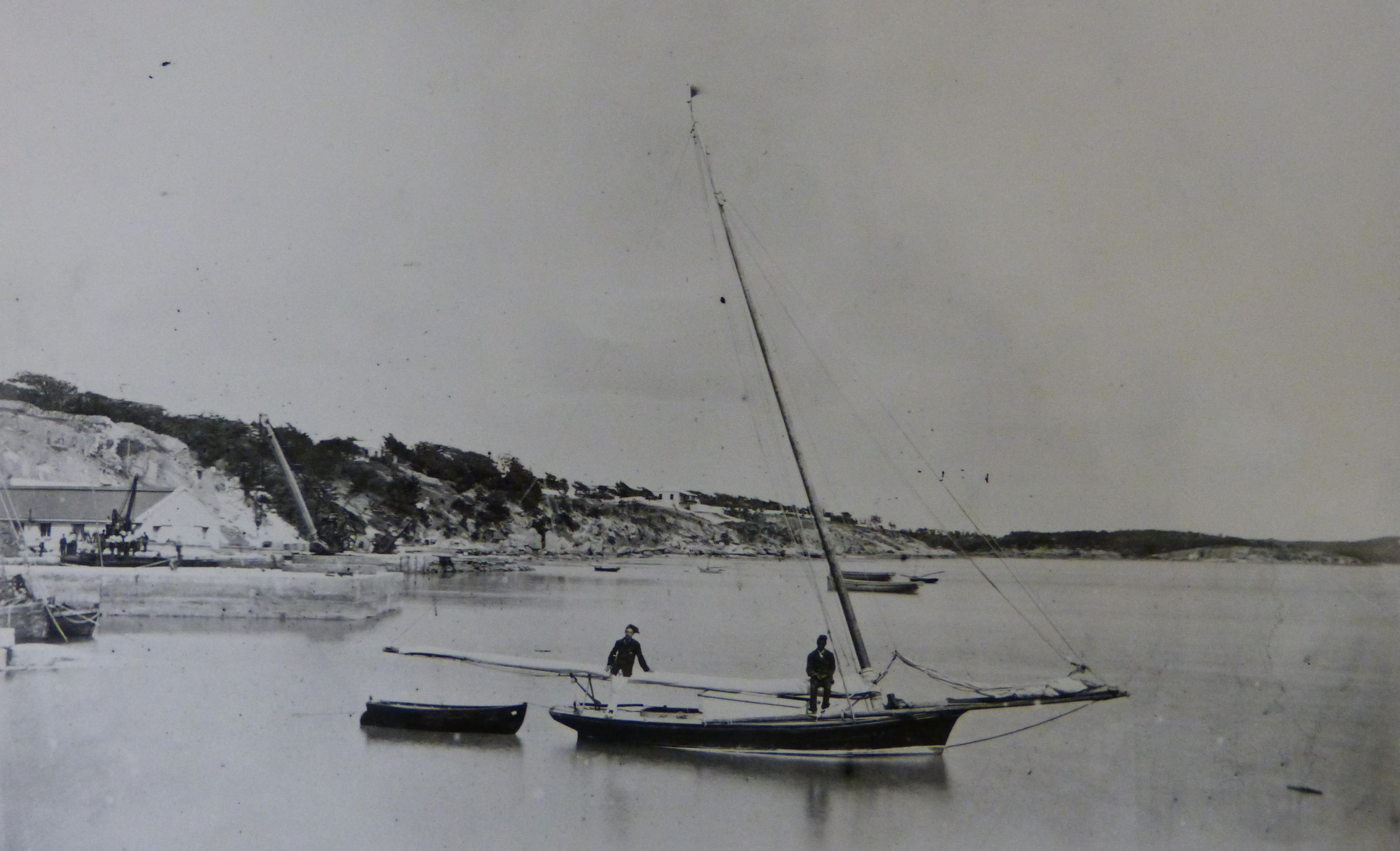
Bermuda rigged sloop at Convict Bay, Bermuda, circa 1879

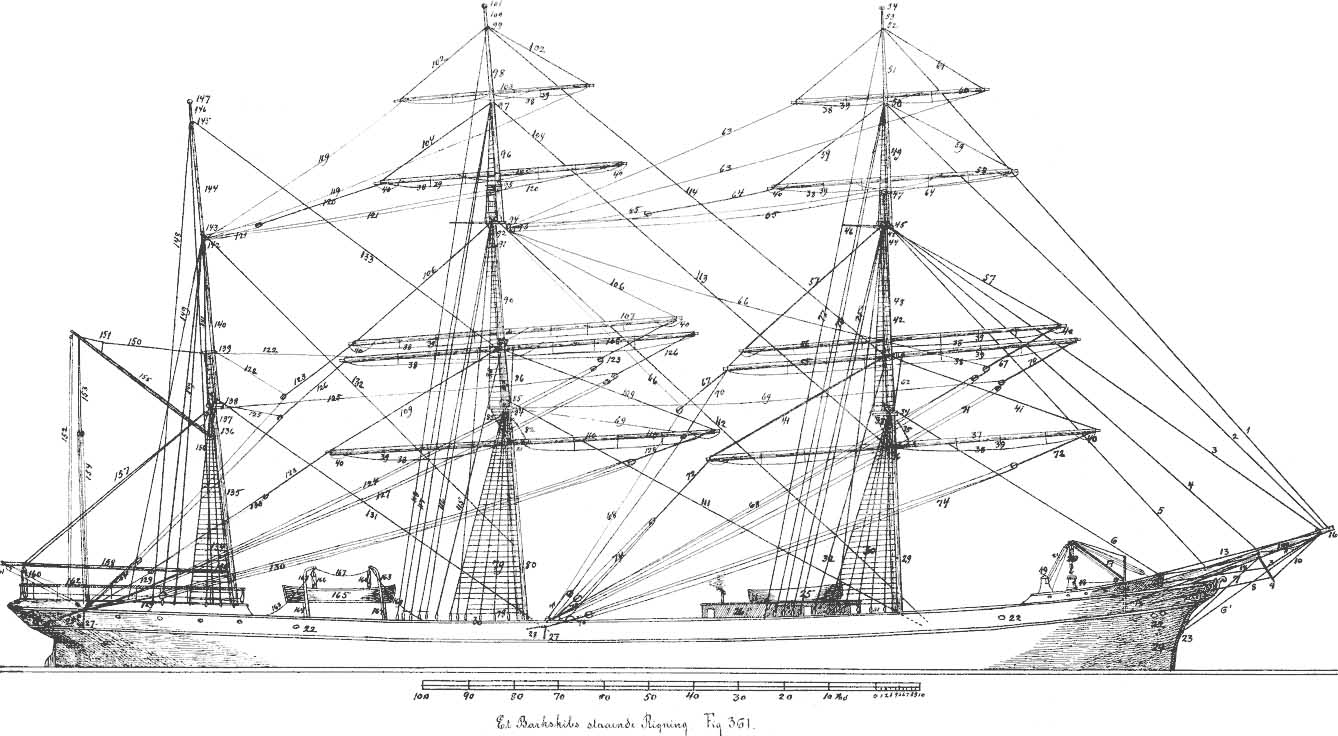
Standing rigging on a square-rigged vessel.

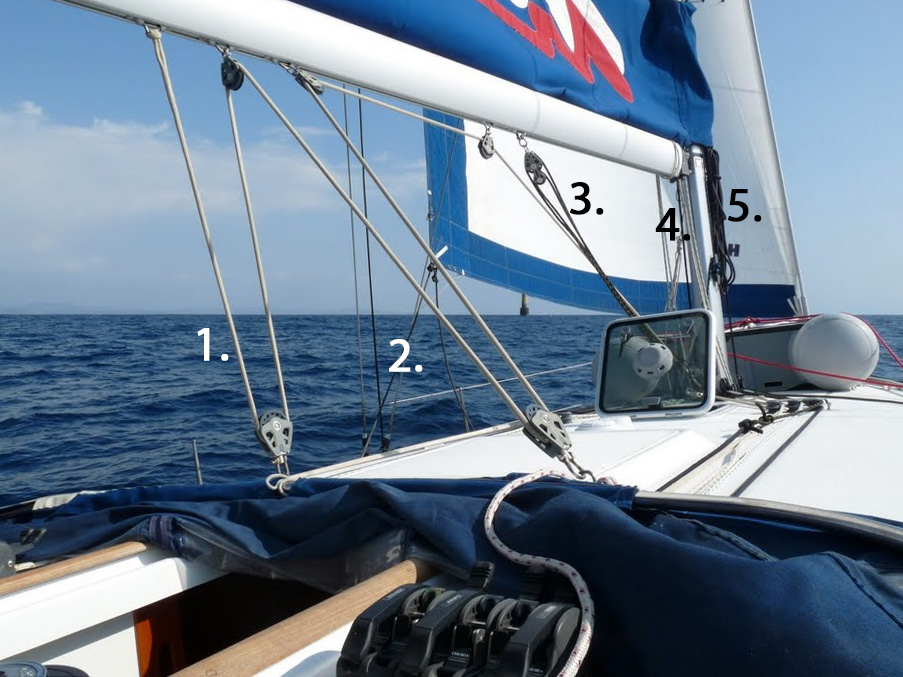
Running rigging on a sailing yacht: 1. Main sheet 2. Jib sheet 3. Boom vang 4. Downhaul 5. Jib halyard

Rigging comprises the system of ropes, cables and chains, which support and control a sailing ship or sail boat's masts and sails. Standing rigging is the fixed rigging that supports masts including shrouds and stays. Running rigging is rigging which adjusts the position of the vessel's sails and spars including halyards, braces, sheets and vangs.

== Etymology ==
According to the Encyclopædia Britannica Eleventh Edition "rigging" derives from Anglo-Saxon wrigan or wringing, "to clothe". The same source points out that "rigging" a sailing vessel refers to putting all the components in place to allow it to function, including the masts, spars, sails and the rigging.

== History ==
Theophrastus in his History of Plants (c. 300 BCE) states that the rigging on King Antigonus' fleet was made from papyrus reed.

== Types of rigging ==
Rigging is divided into two classes, standing, which supports the mast (and bowsprit), and running, which controls the orientation of the sails and their degree of reefing. Configurations differ for each type of rigging, between fore-and-aft rigged vessels and square-rigged vessels.

=== Standing ===
Standing rigging is cordage which is fixed in position. Standing rigging is almost always between a mast and the deck, using tension to hold the mast firmly in place. Due to its role, standing rigging is now most commonly made of steel cable. It was historically made of the same materials as running rigging, only coated in tar for added strength and protection from the elements.

==== Fore-and-aft rigged vessels ====
Most fore-and-aft rigged vessels have the following types of standing rigging: a forestay, a backstay, and upper and lower shrouds (side stays). Less common rigging configurations are diamond stays and jumpers. Both of these are used to keep a thin mast in column especially under the load of a large down wind sail or in strong wind. Rigging parts include swageless terminals, swage terminals, shackle toggle terminals and fail-safe wire rigging insulators.

==== Square-rigged vessels ====
Whereas 20th-century square-rigged vessels were constructed of steel with steel standing rigging, prior vessels used wood masts with hemp-fiber standing rigging. As rigs became taller by the end of the 19th century, masts relied more heavily on successive spars, stepped one atop the other to form the whole, from bottom to top: the lower mast, top mast, and topgallant mast. This construction relies heavily on support by a complex array of stays and shrouds. Each stay in either the fore-and-aft or athwartships direction has a corresponding one in the opposite direction providing counter-tension. Fore-and-aft the system of tensioning start with the stays that are anchored in front of each mast. Shrouds are tensioned by pairs of deadeyes, circular blocks that have the large-diameter line run around them, whilst multiple holes allow smaller line—lanyards—to pass multiple times between the two and thereby allow tensioning of the shroud. In addition to overlapping the mast below, the top mast and topgallant mast are supported laterally by shrouds that pass around either a platform, called a "top", or cross-wise beams, called "crosstrees". Each additional mast segment is supported fore and aft by a series of stays that lead forward. These lines are countered in tension by backstays, which are secured along the sides of the vessel behind the shrouds.

=== Running ===
Running rigging is the cordage used to control the shape and position of the sails. Materials have evolved from the use of Manila rope to synthetic fibers, which include dacron, nylon and kevlar. Running rigging varies between fore-and-aft rigged vessels and square-rigged vessels. They have common functions between them for supporting, shaping and orienting sails, which employ different mechanisms. For supporting sails, halyards (sometimes haulyards), are used to raise sails and control luff tension. On gaff-rigged vessels, topping lifts hold the yards across the top of the sail aloft. Sail shape is usually controlled by lines that pull at the corners of the sail, including the outhaul at the clew and the downhaul at the tack on fore-and-aft rigs. The orientation of sails to the wind is controlled primarily by sheets, but also by braces, which position the yard arms with respect to the wind on square-rigged vessels.

== See also ==
- Full-rigged ship
- Bermuda rig
- Lateen rig
- Junk rig
- Shipbuilding
- Superstructure
