= Beneteau 393 =

Sailboat class

Development
- Designer: Berret-Racoupeau
- Location: France
- Year: 2002
- No. built: 600
- Builder: Beneteau
- Role: Cruiser
- Name: Beneteau 393

Boat
- Displacement: 17,152 lb (7,780 kg)
- Draft: 5.08 ft (1.55 m)

Hull
- Type: monohull
- Construction: glassfibre
- LOA: 38.16 ft (11.63 m)
- LWL: 35.08 ft (10.69 m)
- Beam: 13.00 ft (3.96 m)
- Engine: Volvo 40 hp (30 kW) diesel engine

Hull appendages
- Keel: Fin keel, with weighted bulb
- Ballast: 5,357 lb (2,430 kg)
- Rudder: Spade-type rudder

Rig
- Rig type: Bermuda rig
- I foretriangle height: 46.08 ft (14.05 m)
- J foretriangle base: 14.50 ft (4.42 m)
- P mainsail luff: 40.33 ft (12.29 m)
- E mainsail foot: 15.08 ft (4.60 m)

Sails
- Sailplan: Masthead sloop
- Mainsail area: 304.09 sq ft (28.251 m^{2})
- Jib/genoa area: 334.08 sq ft (31.037 m^{2})
- Total sail area: 638.17 sq ft (59.288 m^{2})

The Beneteau 393, also called the Beneteau Oceanis 393 and for the yacht charter role, the Moorings 403, is a French sailboat that was designed by Berret-Racoupeau as a cruiser and first built in 2002.

The design was developed into the Beneteau Cyclades 39.3 for the yacht charter market, in 2007.

== Production ==
The design was built by Beneteau in France, and also in their plant in Marion, South Carolina, United States, from 2002 until 2007 with 600 boats completed, but it is now out of production.

== Design ==
The Beneteau 393 is a recreational keelboat, built predominantly of glassfibre, with wood trim. The hull is solid fibreglass and the deck is balsa-cored. It has a masthead sloop rig, with a deck-stepped mast, two sets of swept spreaders and aluminium spars with stainless steel wire standing rigging. The hull has a raked stem, a reverse transom with a swimming platform, an internally mounted spade-type rudder controlled by a wheel and a fixed fin keel with a weighted bulb or optional deep-draft keel. It displaces 17,152 lb (7,780 kg) and carries 5,357 lb (2,430 kg) of cast iron ballast.

The boat has a draft of 5.08 ft (1.55 m) with the standard keel and 6.25 ft (1.91 m) with the optional deep draft keel.

The boat is fitted with a Swedish Volvo diesel engine of 40 hp (30 kW) for docking and manoeuvring. The fuel tank holds 36 U.S. gallons (140 L; 30 imp gal) and the fresh water tank has a capacity of 119 U.S. gallons (450 L; 99 imp gal).

The design has sleeping accommodation for four or six people in two of three cabins. The three cabin interior is typical, it has a double berth in the bow cabin, a U-shaped settee in the main salon and two aft cabins, each with a double berth. The galley is located on the starboard side in the main salon. The galley is of straight configuration and is equipped with a four-burner stove, a refrigerator, freezer and a double sink. There are two heads, one just forward of the bow cabin in the forepeak and one on the starboard side, aft. Cabin headroom is 78 in (198 cm).

The design has a hull speed of 7.94 kn (14.70 km/h).

== Operational history ==
In a 2002 review written for Cruising World, Darrell Nicholson noted, "we sailed the boat in 17 knots of gusty, southwesterly wind on Narragansett Bay. Whitecaps and a rolling ocean swell greeted us off Castle Hill when we cleared the entrance to the bay. Hard on the wind, we were punching through the steep, tide-opposed waves at about 6.5 knots, yet the cockpit stayed surprisingly dry even without a dodger, which the boat is well set up to accommodate. The molded cabin liner and bulkheads bonded to the hull on all sides provided ample structural support. The hull shape, a fairly fine entry at the bow with a broad flat section aft, made reaching a blast."

In a 2004 boats.com review, David McCreary wrote, "the Beneteau Oceanis 393 is a 39' passagemaker featuring many of the design and esthetic elements as the Beneteau 473, which won the Cruising World's Best Production Cruiser award for 2001. The 393 was the first totally new model to be built at Beneteau's expanded facility in Marion, S.C. She is a sleek and sophisticated cruiser incorporating a voluminous interior filled with an abundance of light and ventilation."

In a 2015 review for Practical Sailor, Darrell Nicholson wrote, "For cruising in comfort and sailing with ease it’s hard to top modern designs like the 393. Openness, creature comfort, and smooth-running systems put boats like these well ahead of the 'narrow, dark, cavelike' designs of just a few years ago. However, if your need is to claw off a lee shore in a gale, to go where the waves are bigger than you are, or to cast off with 'anything goes' readiness, these new coastal cruising designs aren’t as good as the old. That's not to say that the 393 can't go far afield, but if we were doing it, we'd choose the deep-keel option for better lift, the 'classic' mainsail arrangement-and we’d dote on the rig and all its terminals."

== See also ==
- List of sailing boat types
