= Beneteau Cyclades 39.3 =

Sailboat class

Development
- Designer: Berret-Racoupeau
- Location: France
- Year: 2007
- Builder: Beneteau
- Role: Cruiser
- Name: Beneteau Cyclades 39.3

Boat
- Displacement: 15,642 lb (7,095 kg)
- Draft: 6.23 ft (1.90 m)

Hull
- Type: monohull
- Construction: glassfibre
- LOA: 39.27 ft (11.97 m)
- LWL: 35.00 ft (10.67 m)
- Beam: 12.96 ft (3.95 m)
- Engine: Yanmar 40 hp (30 kW) diesel engine

Hull appendages
- Keel: Fin keel with weighted bulb
- Ballast: 4,619 lb (2,095 kg)
- Rudder: Spade-type rudder

Rig
- Rig type: Bermuda rig
- I foretriangle height: 45.70 ft (13.93 m)
- J foretriangle base: 13.55 ft (4.13 m)
- P mainsail luff: 43.63 ft (13.30 m)
- E mainsail foot: 15.09 ft (4.60 m)

Sails
- Sailplan: Fractional rigged sloop
- Mainsail area: 329.19 sq ft (30.583 m^{2})
- Jib/genoa area: 309.62 sq ft (28.765 m^{2})
- Total sail area: 638.81 sq ft (59.347 m^{2})

The Beneteau Cyclades 39.3 is a French sailboat that was designed by Berret-Racoupeau as a cruiser and first built in 2007. The series is named for the Greek island chain.

The Cyclades 39.3 is a development of the 2002 Beneteau 393 from the same design team, optimized for the yacht charter market with innovations such as dual ship's wheels.

== Production ==
The design was built by Beneteau in France, starting in 2007, but it is now out of production.

== Design ==
The Cyclades 39.3 is a recreational keelboat, built predominantly of glassfibre, with wood trim. It has a fractional sloop rig, with two sets of unswept spreaders and aluminium spars with stainless steel wire standing rigging. The hull has a slightly raked stem, a walk through reverse transom with a swimming platform, an internally mounted spade-type rudder controlled by dual wheels and a fixed fin keel with a weighted bulb. It displaces 15,642 lb (7,095 kg) and carries 4,619 lb (2,095 kg) of cast iron ballast.

The boat has a draft of 6.23 ft (1.90 m) with the standard keel.

The boat is fitted with a Japanese Yanmar diesel engine of 40 hp (30 kW) for docking and manoeuvring. The fuel tank holds 58 U.S. gallons (220 L; 48 imp gal) and the fresh water tank has a capacity of 87 U.S. gallons (330 L; 72 imp gal).

The design has sleeping accommodation for six people, with a double "V"-berth berth in the bow cabin, an U-shaped settee in the main salon and two aft cabins, each with a double berth. The galley is located on the port side just forward of the companionway ladder. The galley is of straight configuration and is equipped with a two-burner stove, an icebox and a double sink. A navigation station is opposite the galley, on the starboard side. There are two heads, one in the bow cabin on the starboard side and one on the port side, amidships.

The design has a hull speed of 7.93 kn (14.69 km/h).

== See also ==
- List of sailing boat types
