= Beneteau 49 =

Sailboat class

Development
- Designer: Berret-Racoupeau; Nauta Design
- Location: France
- Year: 2007
- Builder: Beneteau
- Role: Cruiser
- Name: Beneteau 49

Boat
- Displacement: 28,517 lb (12,935 kg)
- Draft: 5.75 ft (1.75 m)

Hull
- Type: monohull
- Construction: glassfibre
- LOA: 49.50 ft (15.09 m)
- LWL: 43.67 ft (13.31 m)
- Beam: 14.75 ft (4.50 m)
- Engine: Yanmar 76 hp (57 kW) diesel engine

Hull appendages
- Keel: Fin keel with weighted bulb
- Ballast: 9,480 lb (4,300 kg)
- Rudder: Spade-type rudder

Rig
- Rig type: Bermuda rig
- I foretriangle height: 59.75 ft (18.21 m)
- J foretriangle base: 18.42 ft (5.61 m)
- P mainsail luff: 51.67 ft (15.75 m)
- E mainsail foot: 18.33 ft (5.59 m)

Sails
- Sailplan: Fractional rigged sloop
- Mainsail area: 473.56 sq ft (43.995 m^{2})
- Jib/genoa area: 550.30 sq ft (51.125 m^{2})
- Total sail area: 1,023.86 sq ft (95.120 m^{2})

Racing
- PHRF: 51-102

The Beneteau 49, also called the Oceanis 49, is a French sailboat that was designed by Berret-Racoupeau as a cruiser and first built in 2007. Nauta Design created the interior.

In 2007, Cruising World magazine named the design Boat of the Year in the Best Full-Size Production Cruiser category.

== Production ==
The design was built by Beneteau in Marion, South Carolina, United States, starting in 2007, but it is now out of production.

== Design ==
The Beneteau 49 is a recreational keelboat, built predominantly of glassfibre, with wood trim. It has a 9/10 fractional sloop masthead sloop rig, with two sets of swept spreaders and aluminium spars with stainless steel wire standing rigging. The hull has a slightly raked stem, a walk-through reverse transom with a swimming platform, an internally mounted spade-type rudder controlled by dual wheels and a fixed fin keel with a weighted bulb or optional deep draft keel. It displaces 28,517 lb (12,935 kg) and carries 9,480 lb (4,300 kg) of ballast.

The boat has a draft of 5.75 ft (1.75 m) with the standard keel and 6.92 ft (2.11 m) with the optional deep draft keel.

The boat is fitted with a Japanese Yanmar diesel engine of 76 hp (57 kW) gasoline engine for docking and manoeuvring. The fuel tank holds 62 U.S. gallons (230 L; 52 imp gal) and the fresh water tank has a capacity of 150 U.S. gallons (570 L; 120 imp gal).

The design was built with two and three cabin interior designs, providing sleeping accommodation for four to six people. The two cabin model has a double island berth in the bow cabin, a U-shaped settee and a straight settee in the main salon and an aft cabin with a diagonal double island berth on the starboard side. The three cabin interior divides the aft cabin into two smaller cabins. The galley is located on the port side just forward of the companionway ladder. The galley is L-shaped and is equipped with a gimbaled three-burner stove, a refrigerator, freezer and a double sink. A navigation station is opposite the galley, on the starboard side. There are two heads, one in the bow cabin on the port side and one on the starboard side aft.

The design has a hull speed of 8.85 kn (16.39 km/h) and a PHRF handicap of 51 to 102 with the standard keel and 69 to 90 with the deep draft keel.

== Operational history ==
In a 2007 Cruising World review, Andrew Burton wrote, "the Beneteau 49 is a sprightly performer thanks to its modern underbody and powerful sail plan. It comes with all the creature comforts for which cruisers could ask, attractive avant-garde styling, and a price that offers an excellent value."

== See also ==
- List of sailing boat types
