= Sun Odyssey 32i =

Sailboat class

Sun Odyssey 32i Deep Draft
Development
- Designer: Philippe Briand
- Location: France
- Year: 2005
- Builder: Jeanneau
- Role: Cruiser-Racer
- Name: Sun Odyssey 32i Deep Draft

Boat
- Displacement: 9,480 lb (4,300 kg)
- Draft: 6.50 ft (1.98 m)

Hull
- Type: monohull
- Construction: fiberglass
- LOA: 31.50 ft (9.60 m)
- LWL: 27.95 ft (8.52 m)
- Beam: 10.83 ft (3.30 m)
- Engine: Yanmar 21 hp (16 kW) diesel engine

Hull appendages
- Keel: fin keel
- Ballast: 2,491 lb (1,130 kg)
- Rudder: spade-type rudder

Rig
- Rig type: Bermuda rig
- I foretriangle height: 40.88 ft (12.46 m)
- J foretriangle base: 11.88 ft (3.62 m)
- P mainsail luff: 36.58 ft (11.15 m)
- E mainsail foot: 13.16 ft (4.01 m)

Sails
- Sailplan: fractional rigged sloop
- Mainsail area: 270 sq ft (25 m^{2})
- Jib/genoa area: 271 sq ft (25.2 m^{2})
- Spinnaker area: 668 sq ft (62.1 m^{2})
- Upwind sail area: 541 sq ft (50.3 m^{2})
- Downwind sail area: 939 sq ft (87.2 m^{2})

The Sun Odyssey 32i is a French sailboat that was designed by Philippe Briand as a cruiser-racer and first built in 2005.

The "i" in the designation indicates that the deck is injection-molded.

The Sun Odyssey 32i is part of the Sun Odyssey sailboat range and was developed into the Sun Fast 32i.

== Production ==
The design was built by Jeanneau in France, from 2005 until 2008, but it is now out of production.

== Design ==
The Sun Odyssey 32i is a recreational keelboat, built predominantly of fiberglass. The hull kis made from single skin fiberglass polyester, while the deck is a fiberglass polyester sandwich. The boat has a fractional sloop rig, with a deck-stepped mast, one set of swept spreaders and aluminum spars with 1x19 strand stainless steel wire standing rigging. The hull has a nearly-plumb stem, a walk-through reverse transom, an internally mounted spade-type rudder controlled by a wheel and a fixed fin keel, shoal dfraft keel or keel and centerboard combination.

The boat is fitted with a Japanese Yanmar diesel engine of 21 hp (16 kW) for docking and maneuvering. The fuel tank holds 18 U.S. gallons (68 L; 15 imp gal), the fresh water tank has a capacity of 45 U.S. gallons (170 L; 37 imp gal) and the holding tank has a capacity of 13 U.S. gallons (49 L; 11 imp gal).

The design has sleeping accommodation for six people, with a double "V"-berth in the bow cabin, an L-shaped settee and a straight settee in the main cabin and an aft cabin with a double berth on the port side. The galley is located on the starboard side at the companionway ladder. The galley is U-shaped and is equipped with a two-burner stove, ice box and a sink. A navigation station is opposite the galley, on the port side. The head is located amidships on the port side. Cabin headroom is 73 in (185 cm).

For sailing downwind the design may be equipped with a symmetrical spinnaker of 668 sq ft (62.1 m^{2}).

The design has a hull speed of 7.08 kn (13.11 km/h).

== Variants ==
Sun Odyssey 32i Deep Draft
This model features a deep draft, L-shaped keel. It displaces 9,480 lb (4,300 kg) and carries 2,491 lb (1,130 kg) of cast iron ballast. The boat has a draft of 6.58 ft (2.01 m).
Sun Odyssey 32i Performance
This model features a taller mast and greater sail area of 570 sq ft (53 m^{2}). It displaces 9,480 lb (4,300 kg) and carries 2,491 lb (1,130 kg) of cast iron ballast. The boat has a draft of 6.58 ft (2.01 m).
Sun Odyssey 32i Shoal Draft
This model has a shoal draft keel for operation in areas with shallower water. It displaces 10,009 lb (4,540 kg) and carries 3,020 lb (1,370 kg) of cast iron ballast. The boat has a draft of 4.92 ft (1.50 m).
Sun Odyssey 32i Keel and Centerboard
This model has a keel and retractable centerboard. It displaces 10,659 lb (4,835 kg) and carries 3,671 lb (1,665 kg) of ballast, made up of a cast iron exterior ballast weight and a steel centerboard. The boat has a draft of 6 ft (1.8 m) with the centerboard extended and 2.83 ft (0.86 m) with it fully retracted.

== See also ==
- List of sailing boat types

Related development

- Sun Fast 32i
