= Beneteau 343 =

Sailboat class

Development
- Designer: Berret-Racoupeau
- Location: France
- Year: 2004
- Builder: Beneteau
- Role: Cruiser-Racer
- Name: Beneteau 343

Boat
- Displacement: 13,448 lb (6,100 kg)
- Draft: 6 ft 2 in (1.88 m)

Hull
- Type: monohull
- Construction: glassfibre
- LOA: 35.50 ft (10.82 m)
- LWL: 30.83 ft (9.40 m)
- Beam: 11.42 ft (3.48 m)
- Engine: Yanmar 29 hp (22 kW) diesel engine

Hull appendages
- Keel: Fin keel
- Ballast: 3,402 lb (1,543 kg)
- Rudder: Spade-type rudder

Rig
- Rig type: Bermuda rig
- I foretriangle height: 43.44 ft (13.24 m)
- J foretriangle base: 12.80 ft (3.90 m)
- P mainsail luff: 39.14 ft (11.93 m)
- E mainsail foot: 13.58 ft (4.14 m)

Sails
- Sailplan: 9/10 Fractional rigged sloop
- Mainsail area: 304 sq ft (28.2 m^{2})
- Jib/genoa area: 346 sq ft (32.1 m^{2})
- Spinnaker area: 941 sq ft (87.4 m^{2})
- Upwind sail area: 649 sq ft (60.3 m^{2})
- Downwind sail area: 1,245 sq ft (115.7 m^{2})

Racing
- PHRF: 147-162

The Beneteau 343, also called the Beneteau Oceanis 343 is a French sailboat that was designed by Berret-Racoupeau as a cruiser-racer and first built in 2004 as a 2005 model year.

== Production ==
The design was built by Beneteau in Marion, South Carolina, United States, from 2004 to 2008, but it is now out of production.

== Design ==
The Beneteau 343 is a recreational keelboat, built predominantly of glassfibre, with wood trim. The hull is solid fibreglass and the deck is balsa-cored. It has a 9/10 fractional sloop rig, with a deck-stepped mast, two sets of swept spreaders and aluminium spars by US Spars with discontinuous stainless steel wire standing rigging. The hull has a slightly raked stem, a walk-through reverse transom with a swimming platform, an internally mounted spade-type rudder controlled by a wheel and a fixed fin keel, a stub keel and centreboard or optional shoal-draft keel. The fin keel model displaces 13,448 lb (6,100 kg) and carries 3,402 lb (1,543 kg) of cast iron ballast, while the centerboard and shoal draft versions displace 14,374 lb (6,520 kg) and carry 4,321 lb (1,960 kg) of cast iron ballast. On the centreboard model the centreboard is steel.

The keel-equipped version of the boat has a draft of 6 ft 2 in (1.88 m), or 4 ft 10 in (1.47 m) with the optional shoal draft keel. The centerboard-equipped version has a draft of 8 ft 6 in (2.59 m) with the centerboard extended and 3 ft 10 in (1.17 m) with it retracted, allowing operation in shallow water.

The boat is fitted with a Japanese Yanmar diesel engine of 21 or 29 hp (16 or 22 kW) for docking and manoeuvring. The fuel tank holds 19.8 U.S. gallons (75 L; 16.5 imp gal) and the fresh water tank has a capacity of 67.4 U.S. gallons (255 L; 56.1 imp gal).

The design has sleeping accommodation for four people in two cabins or six people in three cabins. The three cabin interior has a double "V"-berth in the bow cabin, a U-shaped settee and a straight settee in the main cabin and two aft cabins, each with a double berth. The galley is located on the port side just forward of the companionway ladder. The galley is L-shaped and is equipped with a two-burner stove, an icebox and a double sink. A navigation station is opposite the galley, on the starboard side. The head is located just aft of the bow cabin on the port side and includes a shower. There are two heads, one just aft of the bow cabin on the port side and one on the starboard side in the aft cabin. Cabin maximum headroom is 78 in (198 cm).

For sailing downwind the design may be equipped with a symmetrical spinnaker of 941 sq ft (87.4 m^{2}).

The design has a hull speed of 7.44 kn (13.78 km/h) and a PHRF handicap of 147 to 162 for the fin keel and shoal draft models.

== Operational history ==
In a 2005 review, Darrell Nicholson of Practical Sailor wrote, "sailing in 8 to 14 knots of breeze, this boat is as quick as any similarly sized production boat, and it maneuvered easily. She beats to weather within 35 degrees of the apparent wind, and accelerates quickly out of a tack. She’s also stiff: we did not consider tucking in a reef even when we encountered an 18 to 24-inch chop in 14 knots of wind."

In a 2005 review for Sailing Magazine, John Kretschmer stated, "out on the water I conned the boat to windward as McCallum trimmed the sheets. The performance was impressive. Although the new instruments were proving unreliable, it was obvious that our boat speed was good. The helm was light despite being over canvassed at times with the big genny and we had a lot of power to punch through the chop. "

== See also ==
- List of sailing boat types
