= Sun Fast 32i =

Sailboat class

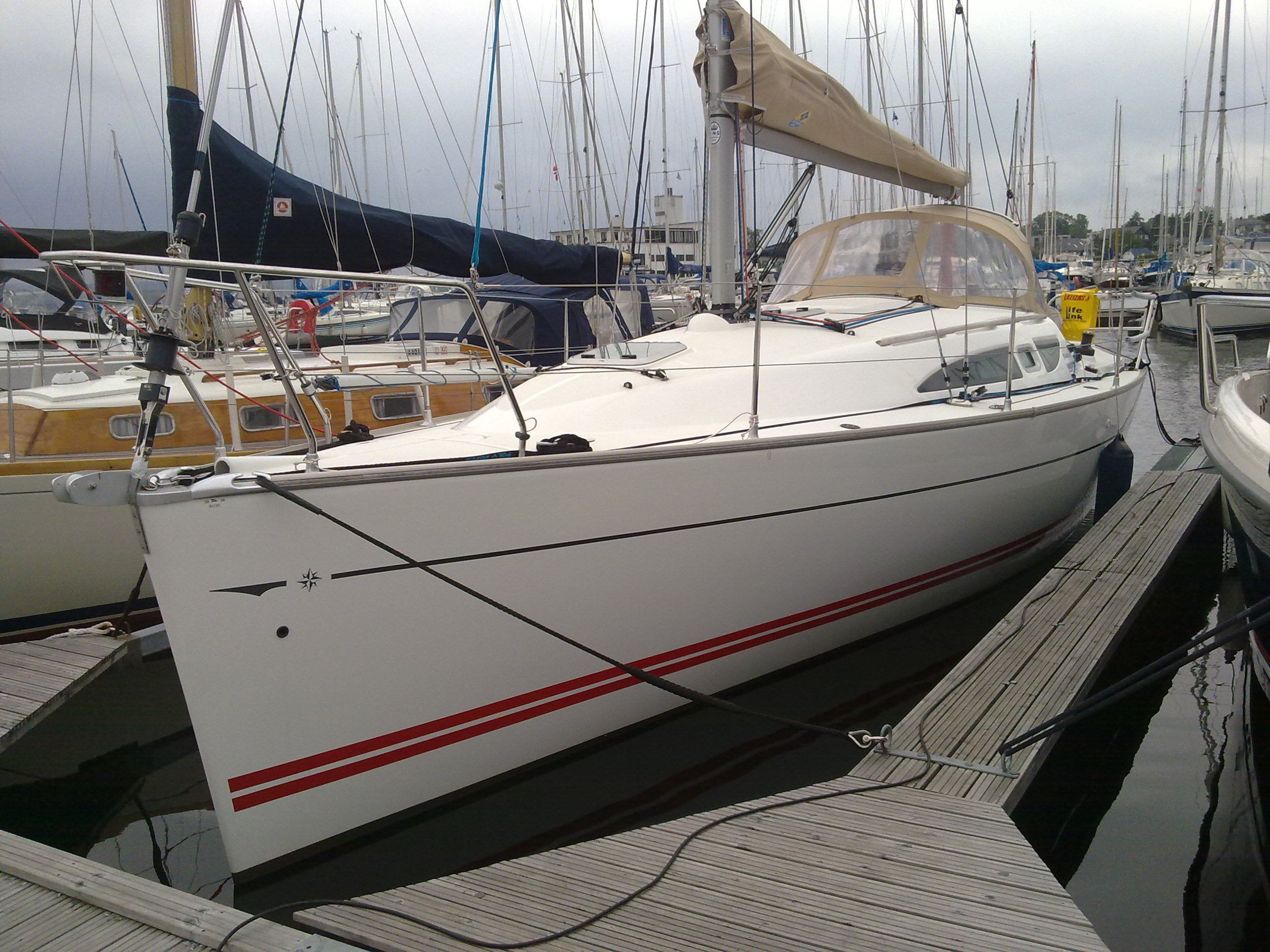

Development
- Designer: Philippe Briand
- Location: France
- Year: 2001
- Builder: Jeanneau
- Role: Racer-Cruiser
- Name: Sun Fast 32i

Boat
- Displacement: 9,237 lb (4,190 kg)
- Draft: 6.50 ft (1.98 m)

Hull
- Type: monohull
- Construction: fiberglass
- LOA: 31.50 ft (9.60 m)
- LWL: 27.95 ft (8.52 m)
- Beam: 10.83 ft (3.30 m)
- Engine: Yanmar 27 hp (20 kW) diesel engine

Hull appendages
- Keel: fin keel with bulb weight
- Ballast: 2,491 lb (1,130 kg)
- Rudder: spade-type rudder

Rig
- Rig type: Bermuda rig
- I foretriangle height: 39.21 ft (11.95 m)
- J foretriangle base: 11.88 ft (3.62 m)
- P mainsail luff: 36.61 ft (11.16 m)
- E mainsail foot: 12.17 ft (3.71 m)

Sails
- Sailplan: fractional rigged sloop
- Mainsail area: 274 sq ft (25.5 m^{2})
- Jib/genoa area: 307 sq ft (28.5 m^{2})
- Spinnaker area: 721 sq ft (67.0 m^{2})
- Upwind sail area: 581 sq ft (54.0 m^{2})
- Downwind sail area: 996 sq ft (92.5 m^{2})
- Total sail area: 455.68 sq ft (42.334 m^{2})

The Sun Fast 32i is a French sailboat that was designed by Philippe Briand as a racer-cruiser and first built in 2001.

The "i" in the designation indicates that the deck is injection-molded.

The Sun Fast 32i is part of the Sun Fast sailboat range and a development of the Sun Odyssey 32i, using a taller mast, deeper keel and upgraded racing hardware.

== Production ==
The design was built by Jeanneau in France, from 2001 to 2007, but it is now out of production.

== Design ==
The Sun Fast 32i is a recreational keelboat, built predominantly of fiberglass. The hull is made from single-skin fiberglass polyester, while the deck is injection molded fiberglass polyester. It has a 9/10 fractional sloop rig, with a keel-stepped mast, two sets of spreaders and aluminum spars with Dyform rigging. The hull has a nearly-plumb stem, a walk-through reverse transom, an internally mounted spade-type rudder controlled by a tiller and a fixed fin keel with a swept weight bulb. It displaces 9,237 lb (4,190 kg) and carries 2,491 lb (1,130 kg) of ballast.

The boat has a draft of 6.50 ft (1.98 m) with the standard keel.

The boat is fitted with an inboard Yanmar diesel engine of 27 hp (20 kW) for docking and maneuvering. The fuel tank holds 18 U.S. gallons (68 L; 15 imp gal) and the fresh water tank has a capacity of 45 U.S. gallons (170 L; 37 imp gal).

The design has sleeping accommodation for six people, with a double "V"-berth in the bow cabin, an L-shaped settee and a straight settee in the main cabin and an aft cabin with a double berth on the port side. The galley is located on the starboard side at the companionway ladder. The galley is U-shaped and is equipped with a two-burner stove, ice box and a sink. A navigation station is opposite the galley, on the port side. The head is located amidships. Cabin headroom is 74 in (188 cm).

For sailing downwind the design may be equipped with a symmetrical spinnaker of 721 sq ft (67.0 m^{2}).

The design has a hull speed of 7.08 kn (13.11 km/h).

== Operational history ==
The boat was at one time supported by a class club that organized racing events, the Sun Fast Association.

In a 2003 review in Sailing World, Tony Bessinger concluded, "the Sun Fast 32i is a great fit for a prospective owner looking for a sensible way to accomplish several different yachting tasks. Since it's not a flat-out macho racing machine, it won't intimidate or terrify beginning to intermediate-level racers or their friends and family. And while cruising isn't something we do a lot of, we can see the potential for comfortable weekends in the large interior, which sailors who live far from where their boat is kept will appreciate. All in all, the Sun Fast 32i is more Clark Kent than Superman, but remember that old Clark could still hold his own against bad guys and attracted a lot less attention than the fellow in the red cape."

== See also ==
- List of sailing boat types

Related development

- Sun Odyssey 32i
