= HMS Leven =

Three ships of the Royal Navy have been named HMS Leven, probably after the River Leven, Fife in Scotland.

- HMS Leven (1813) was a 20-gun sixth-rate Cyrus-class post ship launched in 1813. Under the command of William Fitzwilliam Owen she surveyed the coast of Africa 1821–26. She was broken up in 1848.
- HMS Leven (1857) was an Algerine-class gunboat launched in 1857. She fought in the Second Anglo-Chinese War and in 1860 became the last Royal Navy ship from which a man was "hanged from the yard-arm". She was broken up in 1873.
- HMS Leven (1898) was a Gipsy-class destroyer launched in 1898. She served in the Home Fleet and the Dover Patrol in World War I and was broken up in 1920.

Additionally:

- HMS Loch Leven (FY 642) was an armed trawler launched in 1928 and taken up by the Admiralty in 1939 for minesweeping. She was returned to trade in 1946 and scrapped in 1954.
