= Deadeye =

Item used in rigging of sailing ships

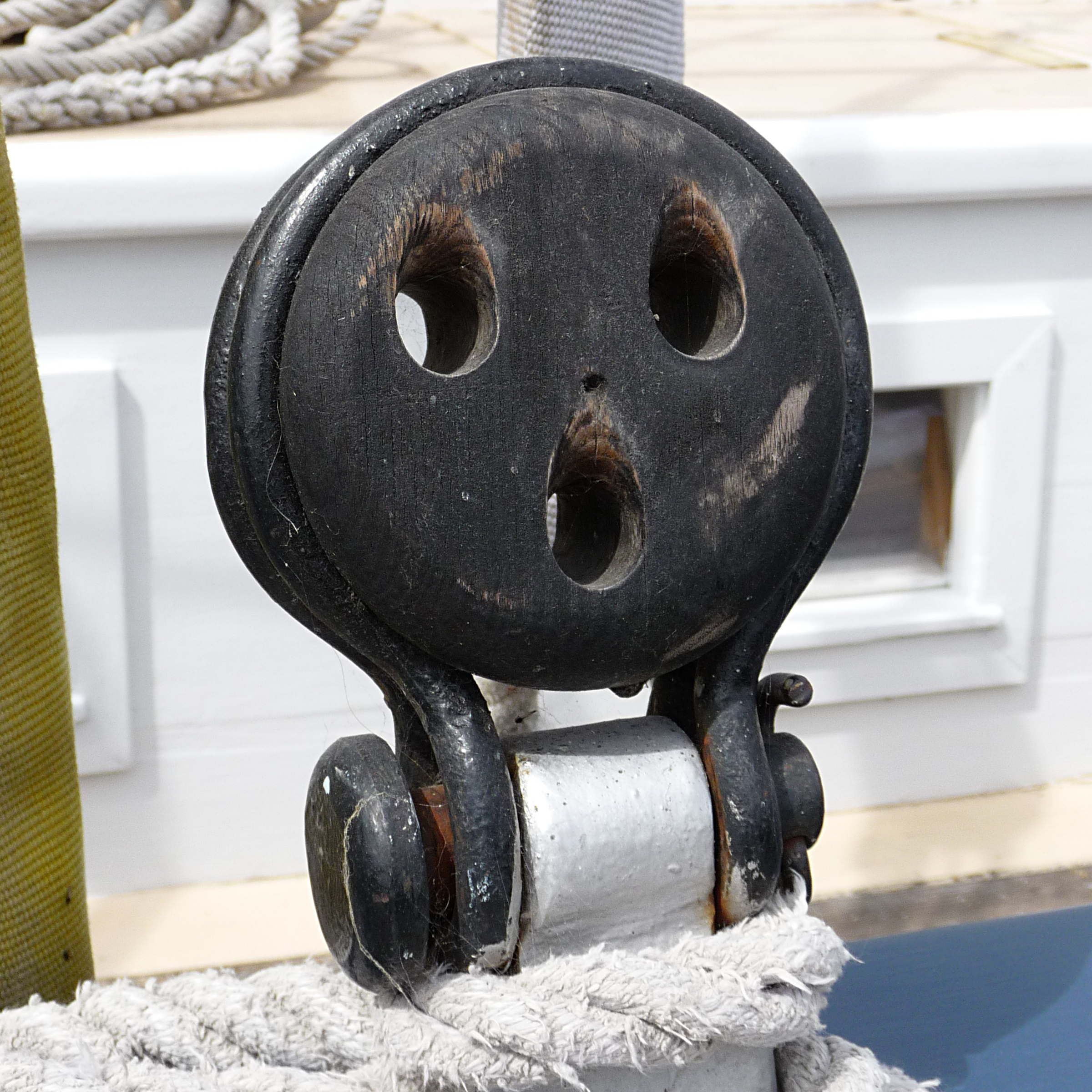
A triple deadeye without a lanyard

A deadeye is an item used in the standing and running rigging of traditional sailing ships. It is a smallish round thick wooden (usually lignum vitae) disc with one or more holes through it, perpendicular to the plane of the disc. Single and triple-hole deadeyes are most commonly seen. The three-holed blocks were called deadeyes because the position of the three holes resemble the eye and nose sockets of a sheep's skull.

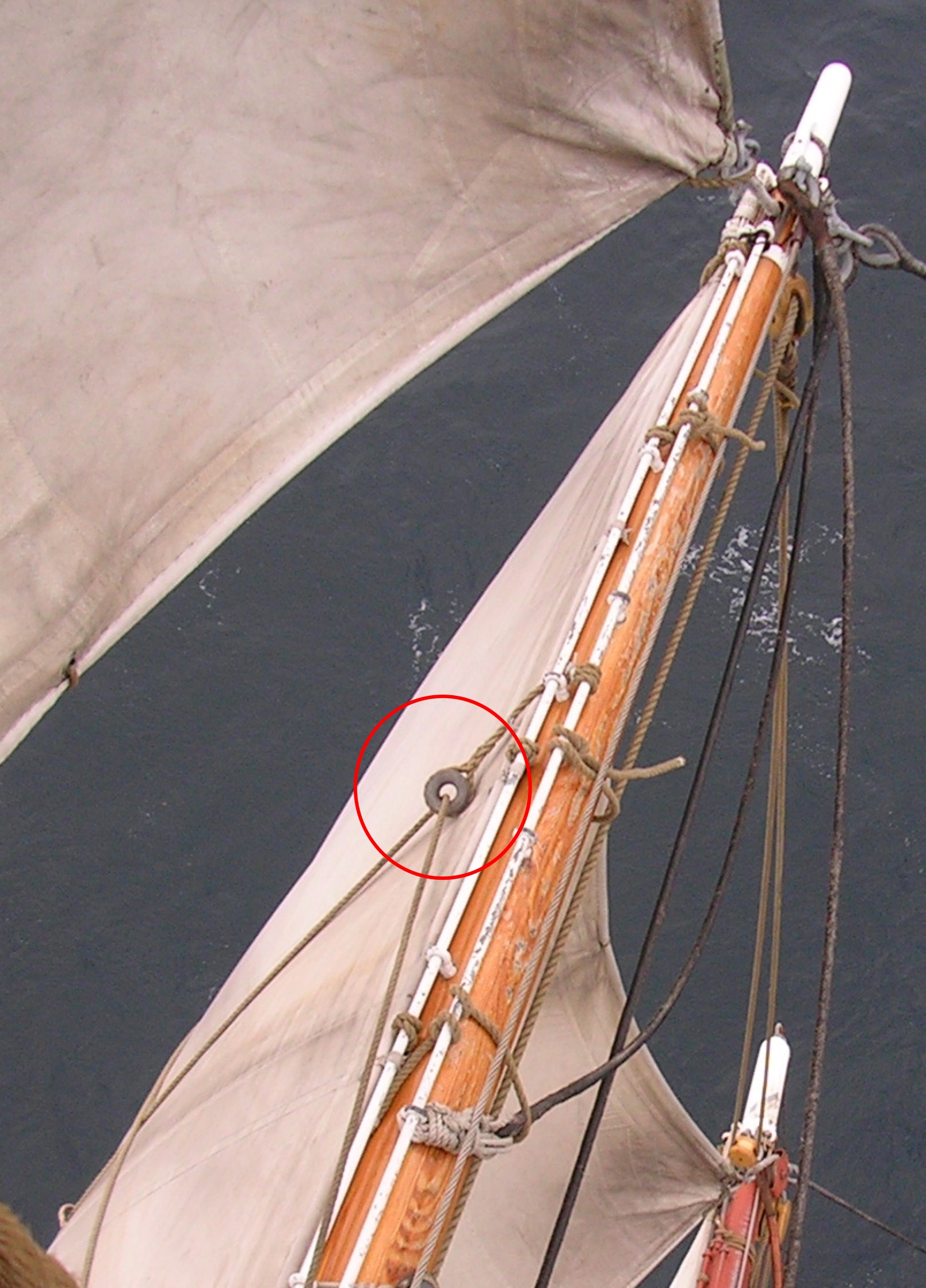
A single deadeye (or bull's eye) used to change the direction of a line, in this case a buntline on Prince William's fore-topgallant.

Single deadeyes (or bull's eyes) are used to guide and control a line and, particularly in older vessels, to change its direction. More modern systems would use a block for this purpose but in traditional rigs with many lines to deal with, designed when blocks were relatively expensive to make, a deadeye provided an acceptable compromise. When blocks came into common use for adjusting running rigging, deadeyes continued to be used for tensioning standing rigging.

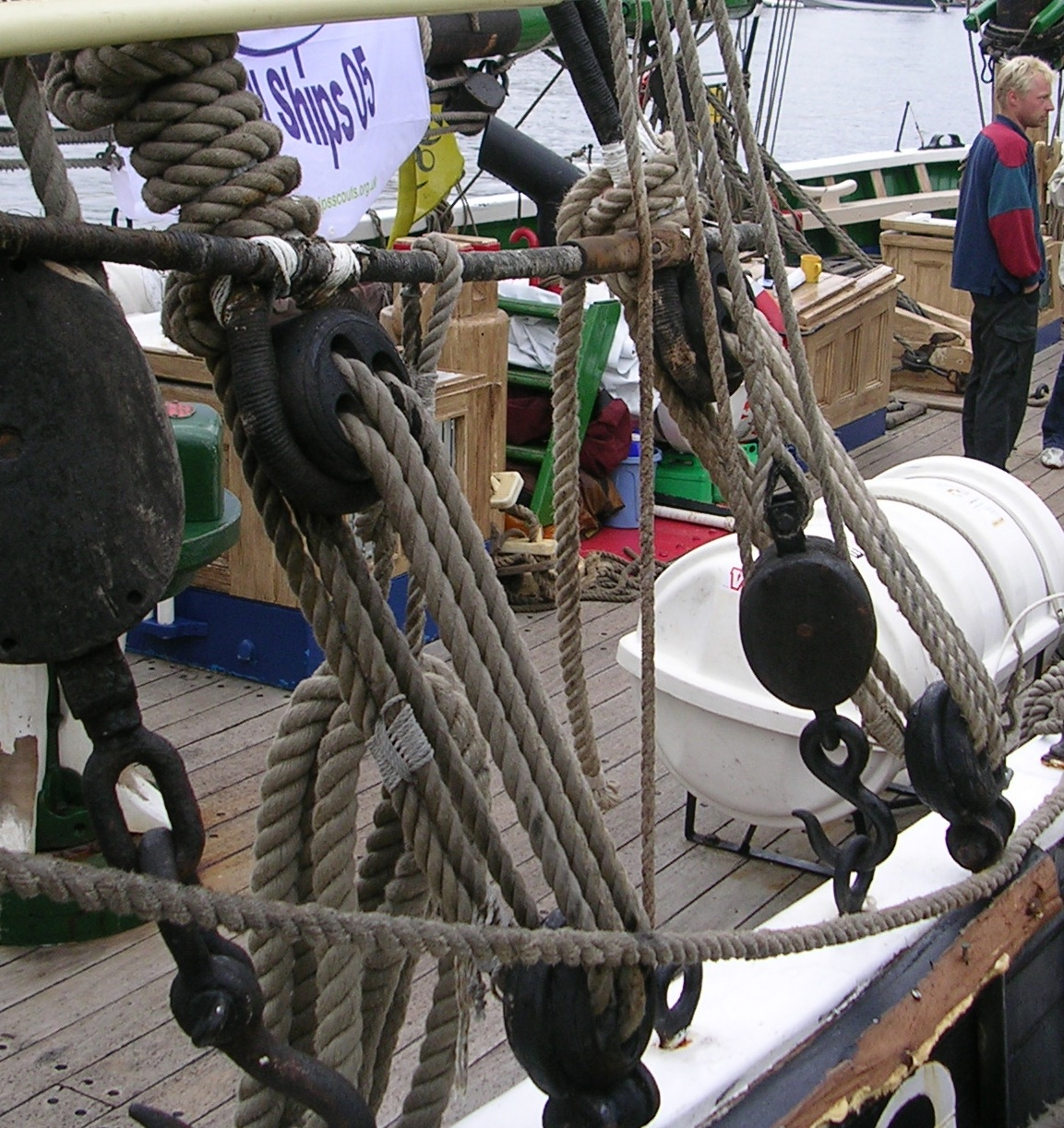
Triple deadeyes and lanyards used to tension the shrouds on the Lowestoft trawler Excelsior.

Triple deadeyes are used in pairs; a line called a lanyard is run back and forth between them, through the holes, so that they function again much as a block and tackle would. This provides a mechanical advantage, pulling harder on whatever the deadeyes are attached to. Pairs of deadeyes are placed in the shrouds (the lines that hold up the mast), where they are used to create greater tension in the shrouds. To set up the lanyards used with dead-eyes, a suitable grease such as tallow is first applied to the holes. After reeving the lanyard through the deadeyes, the end is hooked to a handy purchase in the rig above, such as the throat halyard. By hauling on the halyard the lanyard in the deadeyes is drawn up taut. A small wooden wedge is knocked into the last hole, to prevent the lanyard sliding back, and the end is unhooked from the purchase and made up on the shroud above the upper deadeye. The wedge can then be removed ready for the next shroud. As an alternative the tackle on the lanyard can be made fast to the shroud well above the upper deadeye so that it compresses the deadeyes. The last part of the lanyard can then be seized to an adjacent part between the deadeyes. When this is finished the tackle is cast off and the lanyard made off.

In recent decades, as steel wire became the prevalent material for sailboat rigging, deadeyes and lanyards gave way to metal turnbuckles for tensioning the wires. More recently, however, with the advent of high-strength and low-stretch synthetic fibres, some sailboats are using synthetic rope for standing rigging, and deadeyes and lanyards are coming back into use as tensioning devices. Modern deadeyes, also known as chainplate distributors can be made of titanium or aluminum, manufactured by vendors such as Colligo Marine.

== See also ==
- Turnbuckle
