= Clewlines and buntlines =

Ropes used to handle sails of a ship

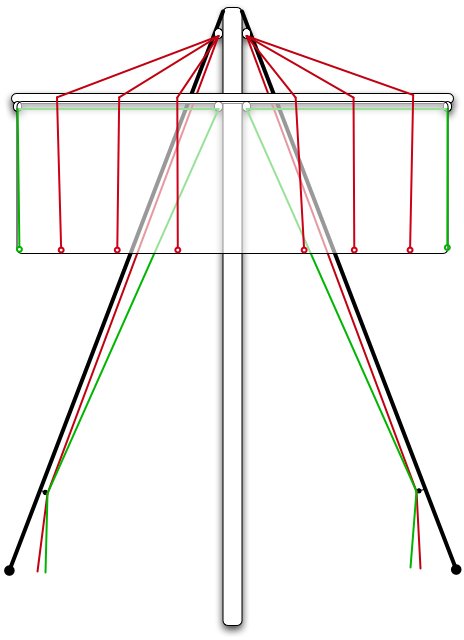
Clewlines (green) and buntlines (red) for a single sail. The sail here is semi-transparent; fainter lines are running behind it.

Clewlines and buntlines are lines used to handle the sails of a square rigged ship.

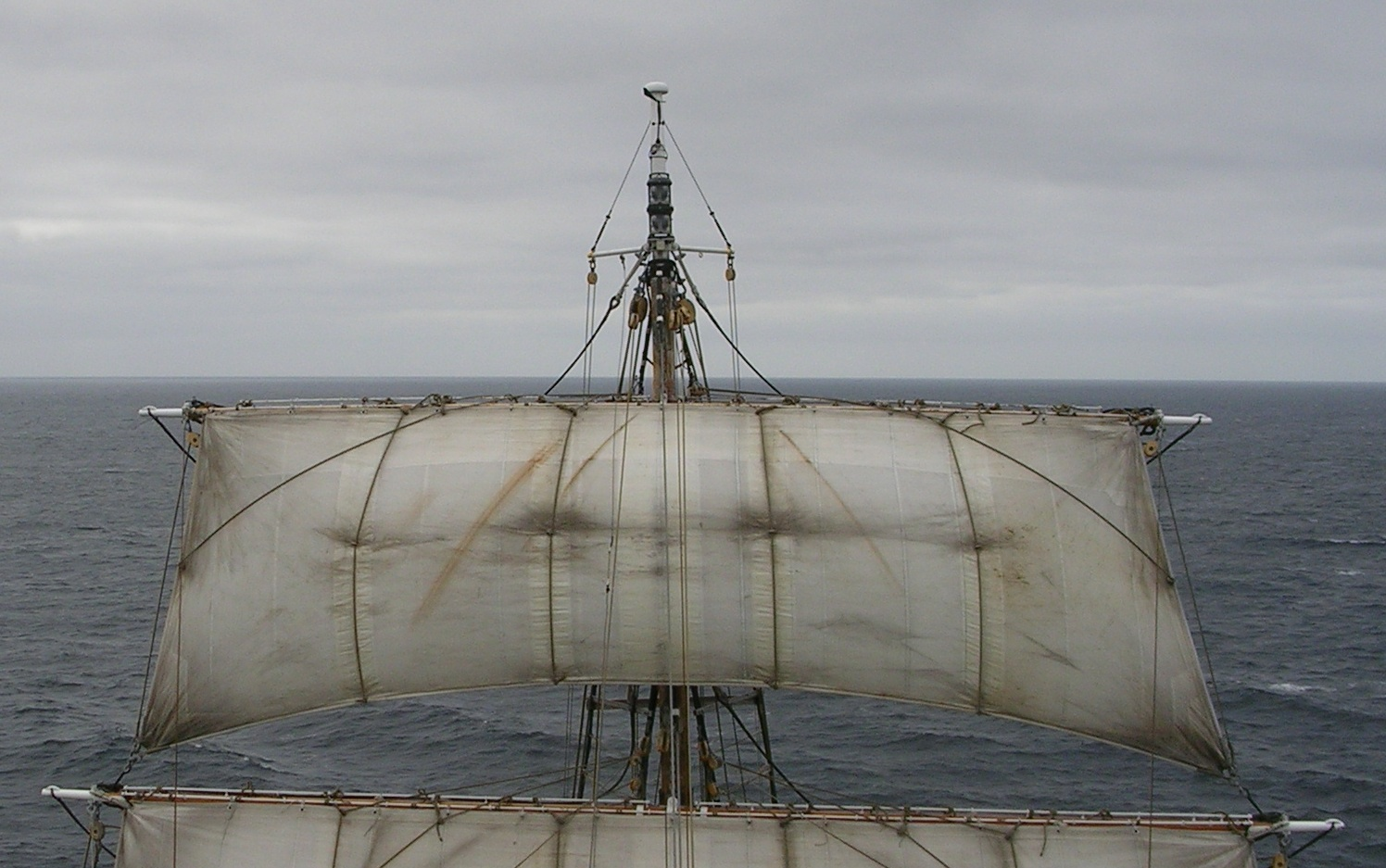
The leechlines are clearly visible running inwards and upwards from the edges of the sail. The buntlines up the front of the sail can be seen too, but their run to the blocks on the shrouds is obscured because the sail is set on a lifting yard.

Although the common perception of a traditionally rigged ship is that the sails are handled from "up in the rigging", the majority of the work is actually carried out from the deck. In particular, when sailors go aloft to stow the square sails by bundling them up and tying them to the yard (with gaskets) they don't have to pull the whole weight of the sail up towards them. That work has already been carried out from the deck using the clewlines and the buntlines.

As the name suggests, clewlines are attached to the outer corners or clews of the sail. They lift more weight than the buntlines, and also have to pull against the sheets - although these will have been released there is still a certain amount of friction produced by the blocks and fairleads that they run through. For this reason the clewlines are usually fitted with blocks to increase the mechanical advantage. The clewlines are coloured green in the diagram, and run along the underside of the yard from the outboard ends to the mast, and then down to the deck.

Buntlines lift the middle portion of the sail, or "bunt"; there will usually be four to eight buntlines across the foot of the sail. Traditionally they are secured to the sail with buntline hitches. Since buntlines only have to lift a section of canvas, they can be thinner than the clewlines and are not usually fitted with a purchase. A typical arrangement for the buntlines has them running through deadeyes on the yard, upwards to a block fixed to the shrouds a little higher up the mast, and then downwards against the inside of the ratlines to the deck. This provides a good lead but does create a minor obstacle to sailors moving out along the yards.

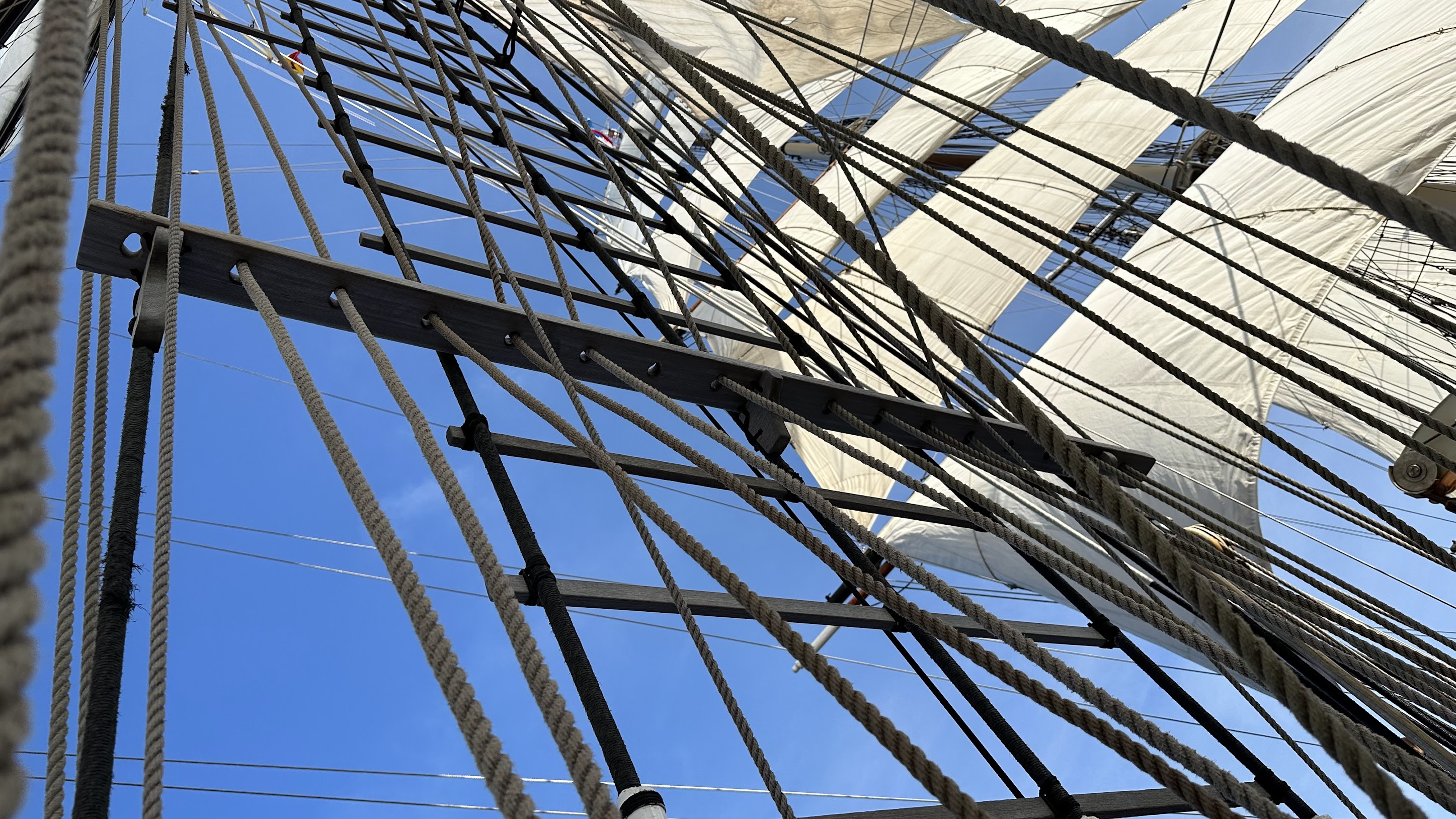
A wooden bar secured to the ratlines that organizes the various sail handling lines leading up the mast

Both clewlines and buntlines are commonly led to the deck against the inside of the ratlines. With six or so buntlines and two clewlines per sail, a ship with five sails per mast will have a lot of lines (note, though, that clewlines and buntlines go to both sides of the deck, so at each set of shrouds there will only be four lines per sail). It is usual to fit a wooden bar near the bottom of the ratlines, with a hole for each clewline or buntline, to keep them organised. The traditional layout is to have the lines from each sail grouped together, starting from the forward end with the clewline and then the buntlines. This will be followed by the clewline of the next sail, and so on - the clewlines and hence the division between sails can be distinguished by their thickness. The lowest sail's lines will be at the forward end of the rail, and the highest will be at the aft end. There may not be an individual belaying pin for each line; since the buntlines are invariably worked together several of them may be secured to the same pin.

Some sails, in addition to clewlines and buntlines, have leechlines to pull the edges into the centre when they are stowed (see picture). However, these can be treated exactly like buntlines, and it is generally not possible to identify a leechline from the deck.

Because the clewlines, and especially the buntlines, do not pass through the axis on which the yard pivots, their effective length will change as the yard is rotated round the mast from one tack to the other. When the sail is set, the lines can be left with plenty of slack to allow for this; if the sail is currently in its gear (see yardarm) then it might be necessary to tend the lines as the yards are braced round.
