= Swaged socket =

Terminal with tubular part plasticly deformed to grip the wire

A swage terminal is a product used to terminate wire. A swaging machine is used to terminate the wire. The wire is passed into a deep hole in the swage terminal which is then pressed onto the terminal by applying force. This type of product is used in the architectural and marine industries. There are many companies globally who manufacture swage terminals, including Sta-Lok.

== See also ==
- Swage
- Swageless terminal
