= Yard (sailing) =

Sail-carrying part of the rigging of a sailing ship

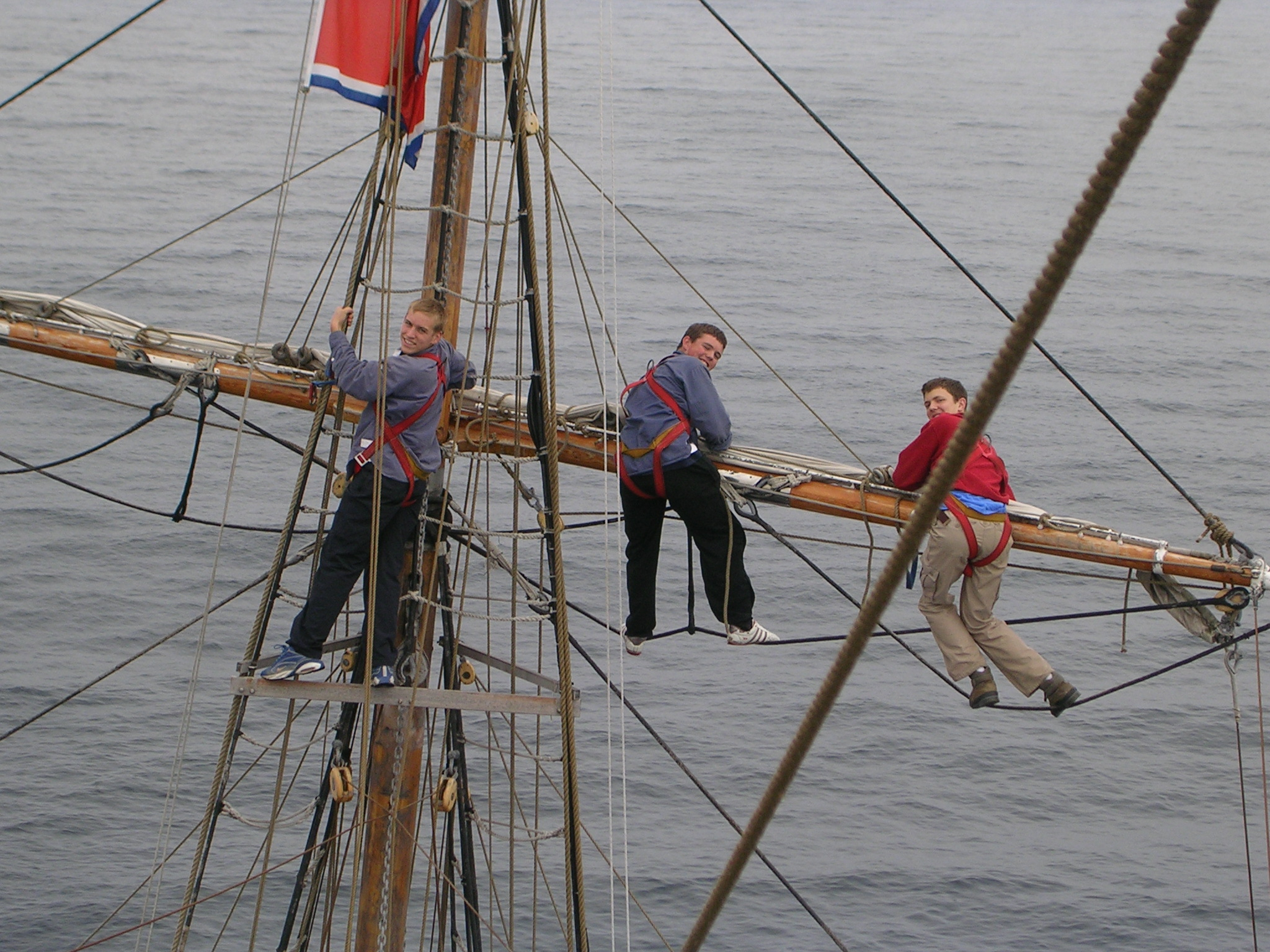
The fore royal yard on the Prince William. Prince William's royal yards are the highest and smallest yards on the ship, are made of wood, and are "lifting yards" that can be raised along a section of the mast. Here it is in the lowered position.

A yard is a spar on a mast from which sails are set. It may be constructed of timber or steel or from more modern materials such as aluminium or carbon fibre. Although some types of fore and aft rigs have yards, the term is usually used to describe the horizontal spars used on square rigged sails. In addition, for some decades after square sails were generally dispensed with, some yards were retained for deploying wireless (radio) aerials and signal flags.

== Parts of the yard ==
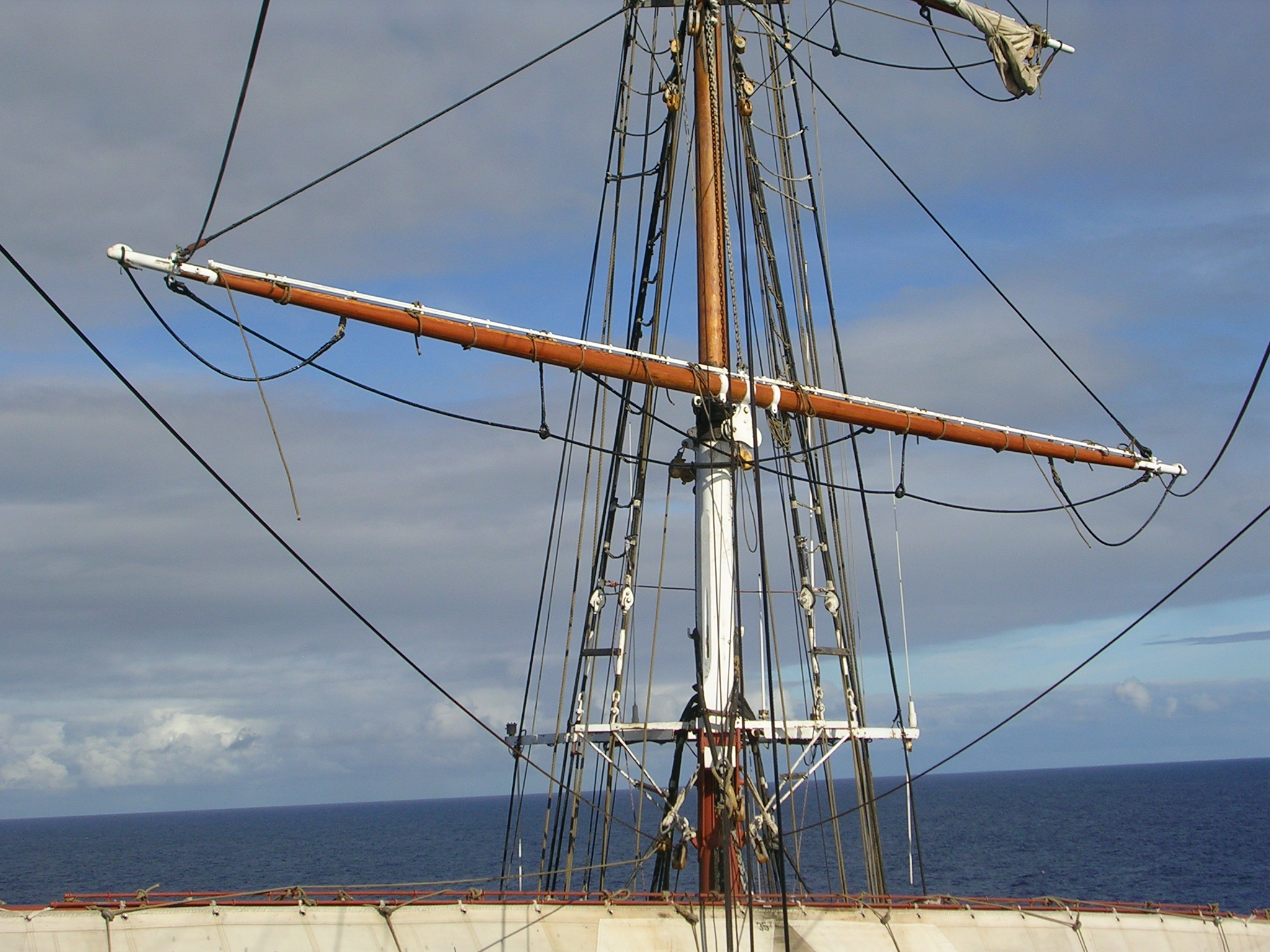
A view of Stavros S Niarchos's main-topgallant yard shortly after maintenance, clearly showing its various parts. On relatively "modern" late-nineteenth-century rigs like this, the quarters make up almost all of it. Click the picture for more details.

Bunt
The short section of the yard between the slings that attach it to the mast.
Quarters
The port and starboard quarters form the bulk of the yard, extending from the slings to the fittings for the lifts and braces.
Yardarms
The outermost tips of the yard: outboard from the attachments for the lifts.

Note that these terms refer to stretches of the same spar, not to separate component parts.

== Controlling the yard ==
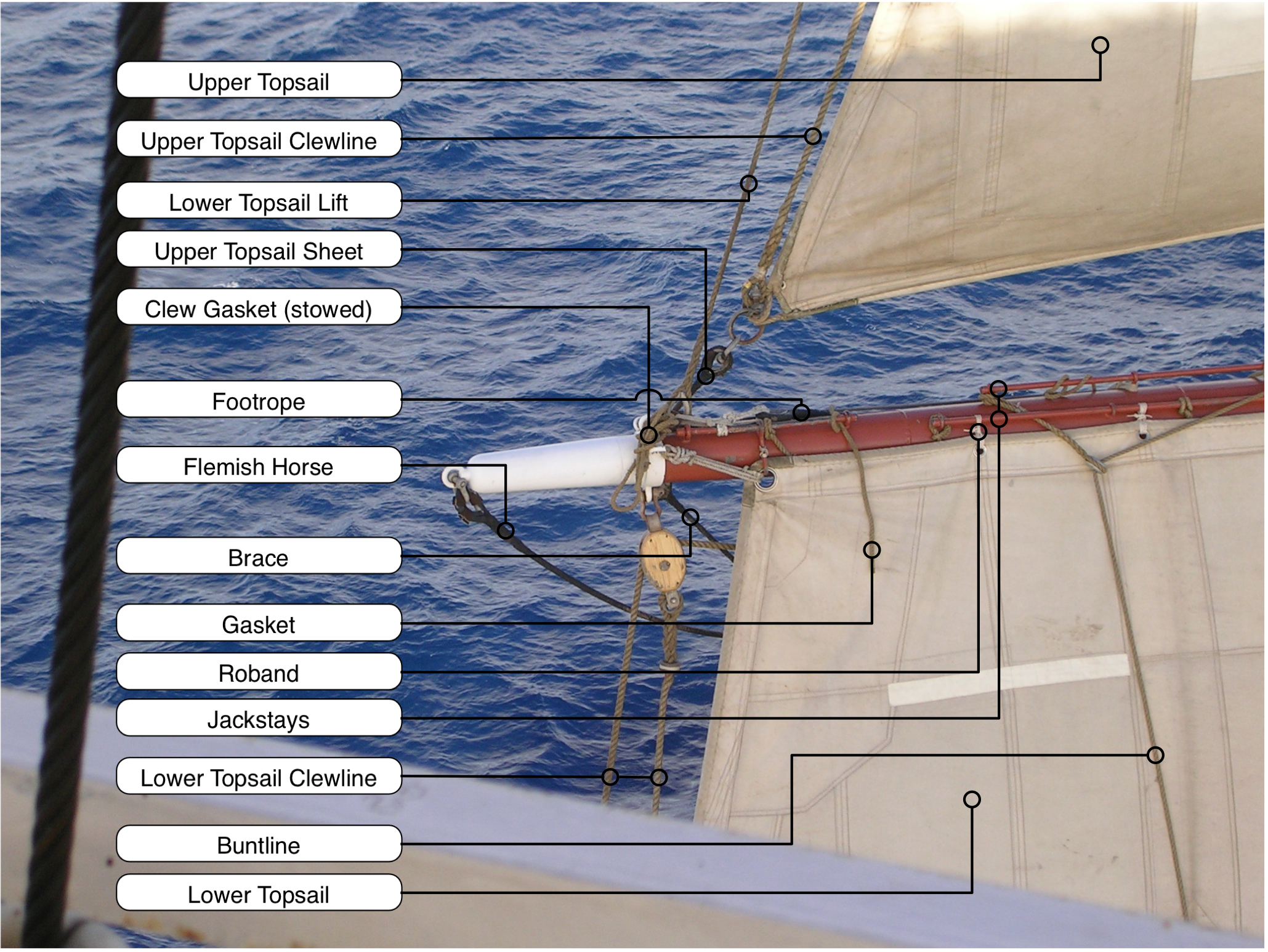
Various items of gear attached to Stavros S Niarchos's lower topsail yard. Click on the image to read the labels.

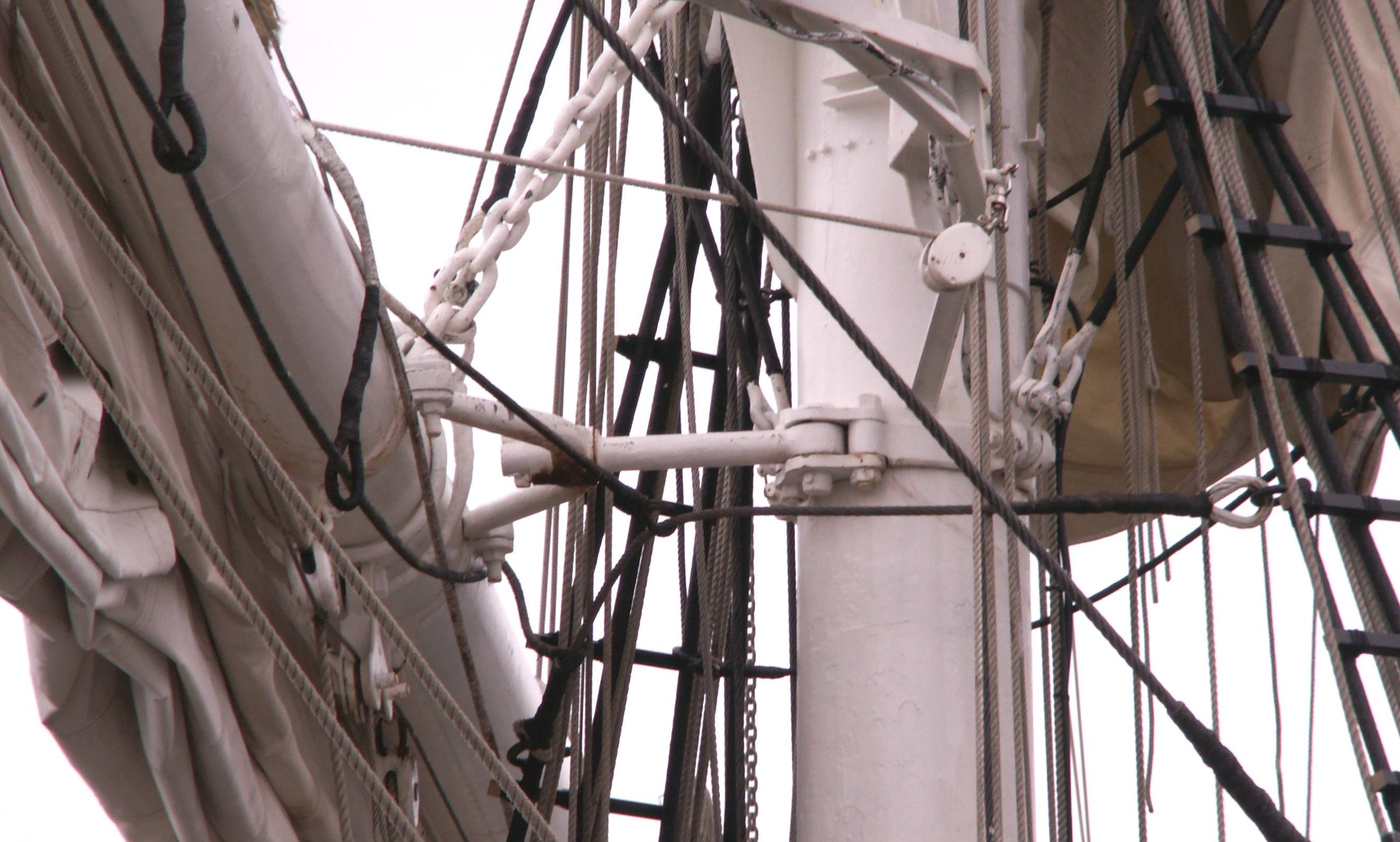
The yards are mounted on the mast in such a fashion as to allow free movement under the control of lifts and braces. The sail on this yard is "in its gear" (see Setting section)—it is hanging below the yard but still folded up rather than spread to the wind.

The yard can rotate around the mast to allow the direction of the vessel to be changed relative to the wind. When running directly downwind the yards are 'squared' (pointing perpendicular to the ship's centre line and to the mast). As the ship is steered closer to the wind the yards are braced round using the braces. When further rotation is obstructed by other bits of rigging (typically the shrouds), the yard is said to be braced "hard round" or "sharp up", as in "sharp up to port". This angle (normally about 60 degrees) limits how close to the wind a square rigged ship can sail.

The yards represent a considerable weight high above the vessel's centre of gravity; to increase stability, especially in heavy weather, some means is normally provided to lower some of the yards when they are not being used to set sails. In nineteenth-century warships (where a large crew was available) this was generally by physically "sending down" the upper yards from the masts and storing them on deck—along with, in many cases, the upper sections of the mast itself. Merchant ships in the age of sail would also do this before sailing in the Southern Ocean. On modern tall ships the yards are not designed to be sent down on deck, but 'lifting yards' that can be raised and lowered along a short section of mast using a halyard are often used.

== Going aloft ==
In order to set and stow the square sails, the crew must climb aloft and spread out along the yards. To do this, they stand in footropes suspended beneath the yard and balance themselves between that and the yard itself. The person working on the end of the yardarm has a separate footrope known as the flemish horse. Jackstays run along the top of the yard. The sail will be bent on to one of them, but a second one is often provided (particularly on larger yards) for the crew to hold on to. These are usually steel rods, but stiff cordage stretched between the yardarms was used in the past.

Almost all ships used in modern times are fitted with steel safety wires (sometimes erroneously called jackstays) along the yards to which sailors attach themselves using a harness. This is a relatively recent innovation. Cargo-carrying and naval sailing ships were not so equipped and falling from the yard represented a real risk.

== Setting square sails ==
The fore course is stowed neatly on top of its yard. On the Prince William this yard is made of steel, does not lift, and weighs around two tons. The two people higher up are working on the fore lower topsail yard. Here, the sails are bent only to the yards' quarters and the yardarms are very short.

The yard exists to allow square sails to be set to drive the ship. The top edge of the sail is 'bent on' (attached) to the yard semi-permanently. Clewlines and buntlines are led along the yard and from there to the mast and down to the deck. These allow the bottom of the sail to be hoisted up to the yard, so the sail is effectively folded in two. In this state the sail is said to be "in its gear", that is ready for setting or stowing. To set the sail the clewlines and buntlines are let go, and the sheets (attached to the bottom corners, or clews, of the sail) are adjusted to shape the sail to best catch the wind. A device called a "tye", a "tye chain", or a "tye rope" is used for lifting a given yard to the top of its travel to set the sail.

To stop using (i.e., to "hand") the sail, the sheets are released and the clewlines and buntlines are pulled tight. The sail folds in half—back in its gear—and so no longer catches the wind. Unless the sail is to be used again very soon, the next step is to "stow" it. To do this, the crew must go out along the yard in order to bundle the sail up tightly and tie it down with gaskets.

== Manning the yards ==
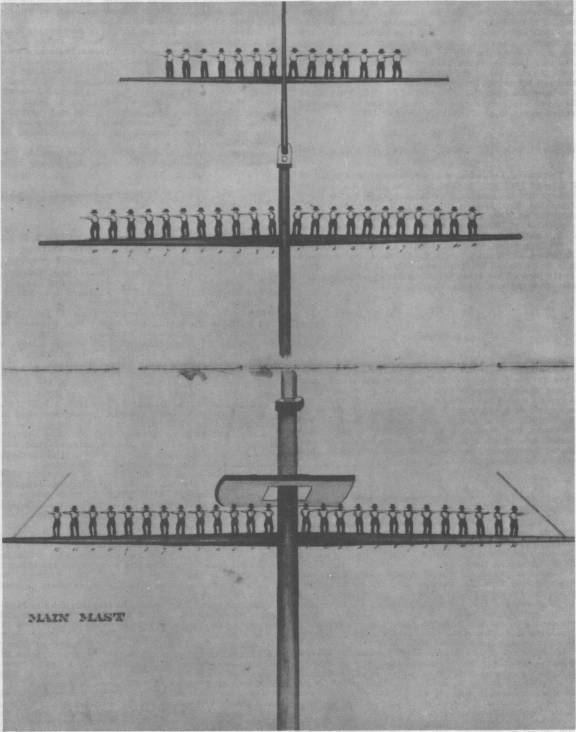
An 1847 illustration of men manning the yards aboard the United States Navy 74-gun ship of the line USS Columbus

When coming into port, especially during the Tall Ships' Races many modern square riggers will 'man the yards'. All the crew not required on deck to handle the ship will go aloft and spread out along the yards. This manoeuvre was originally used to display the whole crew to the harbour authorities and the other ships present, to show that the ship's guns were not manned and hence her intentions were peaceful.

== Fore and aft yards ==
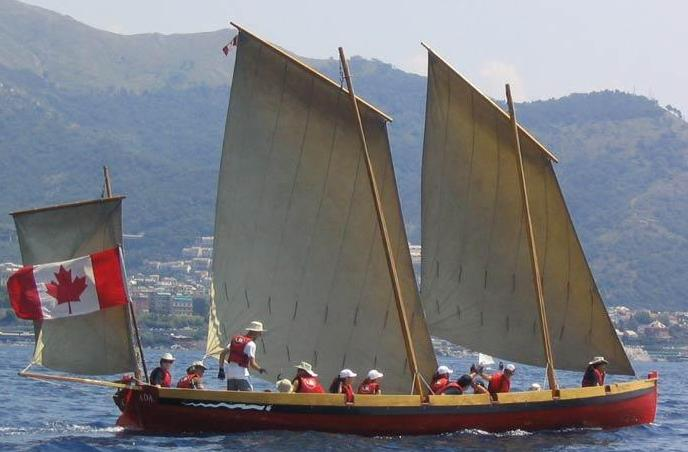
A modern replica of a French ship's boat setting lug sails

Some fore-and-aft rigs are set from a yard. Lateen rig is a triangular fore and aft sail which uses a long yard mounted at an angle (downward sloping forward) from the mast. The lug sail – a four-sided fore-and-aft sail, was probably developed from square-rig. Gunter rig is a development from lug, though in this case, the yard adopts a nearly vertical position. The terminology of gunter rig is less fixed, with the yard sometimes being referred to as a gaff.

== "Sun over the yardarm" ==
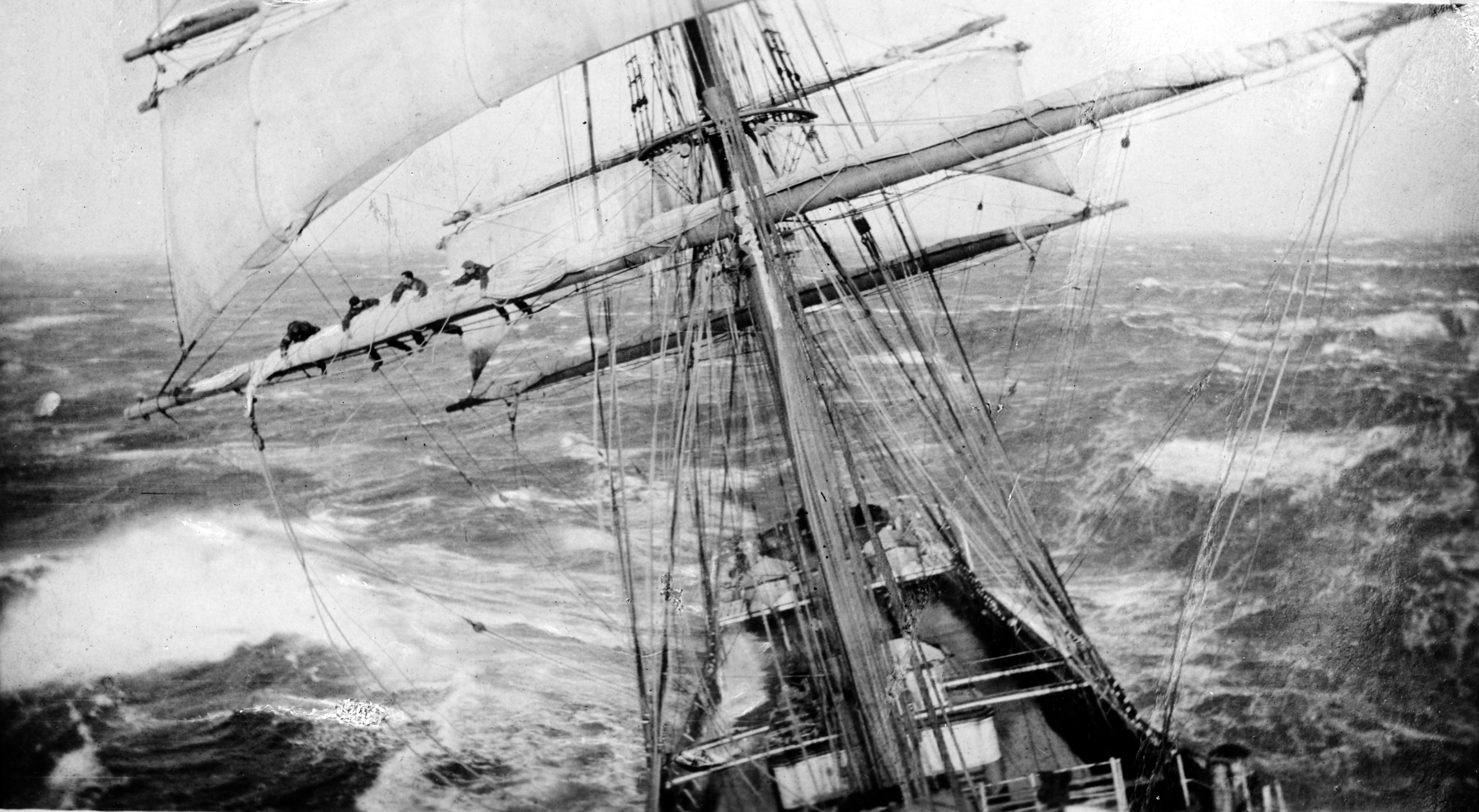
Ship Garthsnaid at sea

The phrase "sun over the yardarm" is used, both afloat and ashore, to indicate that the time of day has been reached at which it is acceptable, variously, to have lunch or (more commonly) an alcoholic beverage. In modern parlance, the latter usage typically refers to early evening, but the phrase is thought originally to have referred to late morning and to the sun's ascent past a particular yard.

The actual time that the sun would pass a particular yard would depend greatly on the ship's latitude and heading, as well as the height of her masts, but the phrase seems to have originated in the north Atlantic, where, in summer, this would have typically been at about 11 a.m. This was the time at which, by custom and rule, the first rum "tot" of the day was issued to men (the senior rates had their tots neat, while the junior rates had theirs diluted with water), hence its connection with taking one's first alcoholic drink of the day.

The earliest mention of this phrase collected by the OED is in Rudyard Kipling's From Sea to Sea in 1899, where it is used as a metaphor referring to drinking habits. However, the phrase was in use earlier, in the same context. One example is from the first volume of Life, from the issue of May 31, 1883.

== The yardarm's use in maritime punishment ==
The yardarm has found use in maritime punishment. In the Royal Navy, offences such as murder, mutiny, desertion or striking an officer carried the death penalty, which at sea would usually be carried out by hanging from the yardarm itself. Instead of the usually quick death a hanging ashore ensured, the condemned man would have the noose placed around his neck, before the end of the rope was passed over the yardarm. A group of sailors would then pull him into the air where he would remain for at least half an hour. The last man hanged in this manner in the Royal Navy was Private John Dalliger in 1860, after stealing brandy and shooting two officers aboard HMS Leven.

Another less common punishment, notably practised upon mutineers from the Dutch East India Company ship Batavia as well as captured pirates, was to be dropped or ducked from the yardarm. This entailed the accused having a rope fixed to the yardarm and tied under their arms, before being dropped into the sea. They would then be hauled back onto the ship, where the punishment could be repeated up to three times. In more severe cases, the offender would then be keelhauled.

== See also ==
- Full-rigged ship
- Glossary of nautical terms (A–L)
- Glossary of nautical terms (M–Z)
- Lateen
- Square rig
- Squaring a yard
- Lugger
