= Furler =

Furler is a surname.

== Notable people with this surname ==
- Sia Furler (born 1975), Australian singer-songwriter
- Bob Furler (1918–1998), Australian rules footballer
- Hans Furler (1904–1975), German politician
- Irina Furler, married name of Australian Russian diver Irina Lashko (born 1973)
- Percy Furler (1904–1991), Australian rules footballer
- Peter Furler (born 1966), Australian musician
