= Gasket (sailing) =

Lengths of rope or sennit used for stowing a sail

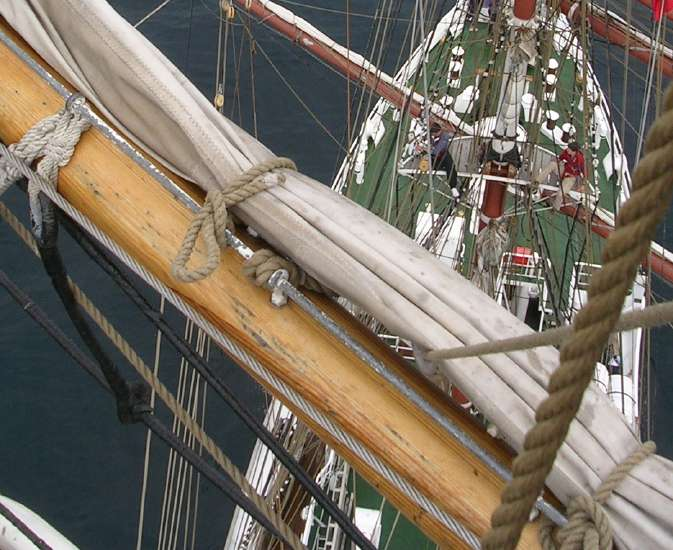
A gasket holding the main-royal on a modern square-rigged training ship.

In sailing, a gasket is a sail tie (a rope that is used to fasten down a furled sail) that is left permanently in position. This is to give ease of use in situations when working in an exposed position, such as on the yard of a square sail, or on a bowsprit. Some gaskets are made of sennit instead of rope.

== Usage and history ==
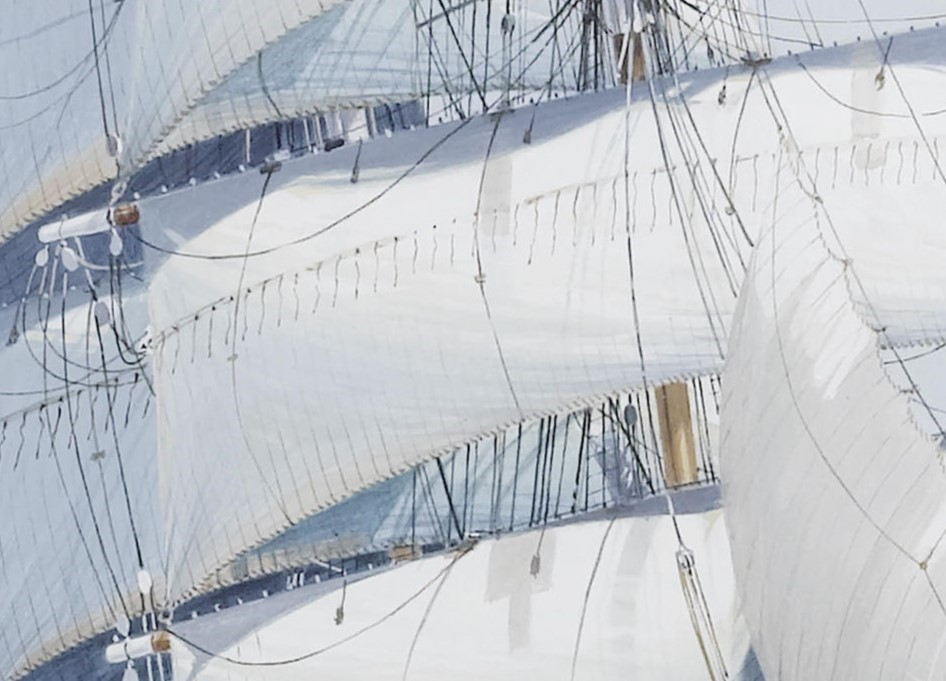
A detail of a painting by Jack Spurling. The coiled gaskets can be seen hanging from the yards at the top of each sail.

In the most recent version of square rig, dating to the end of the 19th century and into the 20th century, square sails were fastened to jackstays, metal rails that went along the top of the yard, spaced a short distance from the yard so that a rope could pass through the gap. The gaskets were also fastened to the jackstay. When stowing a sail, the gasket is passed abaft (behind) the yard and up on the other side, going round both the yard and the gathered-in sail. Each gasket was passed several times around the yard and sail, so as to contain a good length of the furled canvas. When not in use, gaskets were coiled and hung on the fore side of the sail. In a harbour stow (as used by the Royal Navy), special gaskets made of sennit tied the furled sail just to the jackstay: the gaskets did not go round the yard.

Earlier versions of square rig (before c. 1815) did not have a jackstay along the top of the yard. The sail hung underneath the yard, fastened on by robands that passed around the entire yard. Each gasket was spliced to a ring stapled to the yard; there were two rings on each staple. In use, the gasket passed around the sail and yard and was hitched to the second ring on the staple.

Bunt gaskets were used when a large part of the bulk of the furled sail was gathered in to the centre of the yard. These could take different forms, ranging from two long gaskets that were crossed in front of the yard and sail, to triangular nets or pieces of canvas that could be hauled up with a tackle.

In some cases, the gaskets were attached to the head rope of a sail. This meant that if a sail was changed, it was already in a controlled package in its gaskets without any replacement lashings being needed, so that it could be sent down to the deck.
