= Swageless terminal =

In 1973 Sta-Lok launched the swageless terminal system for wire rope at the London Boat Show.

The swageless terminal can be fitted by using hand tools, unlike a swage terminal which requires a special press, roller die or rotary hammer machine to crimp it onto a wire. This makes them very useful if the wire assembly must be made-up on site. A swageless terminal will work under constant loading and variable shock loading, making it stronger than the wire rope.

Regardless of manufacturer the basic principle of operation is the same. The cable has its outer layers wrapped around a metal cone, with the rope's core running through a hole in the middle of the cone. The assembly sits inside a conical outer body. When the cable is in tension, the action is such that the cone and wire are drawn further into the conical bore of the outer body resulting in a large reaction load. This load grips the wire and prevents further movement.

As with swage terminals, swageless terminals are available with a variety of different attachment methods; fixed clevis forks, toggling clevis forks, eyes and threaded studs (for insertion in a turnbuckle barrel).

Swageless terminals can be used for terminating cables for applications in the construction, defense and marine industries.

A swageless terminal can be removed and re-used, unlike a swaged terminal. This makes them very popular in the marine industry as they enable a quick repair to be made to a damaged cable while out at sea. Removing them from the wire end also allows anything which the cable has been threaded through (headstay furler) to be removed for servicing, re-threaded and the fitting re-attached.

There are several manufacturers of swageless fittings including Sta-Lok (who invented the swageless system), Hi-MOD and Norseman-Gibb.
