= Brace (sailing) =

Line used to rotate a yard around the mast

The starboard main-brace and main-topsail-braces are clearly silhouetted against the sea in this photo of the Prince William's bridge and stern deck from her masthead. The main-topgallant and main-royal braces run forwards to the foremast and are not visible in this picture.

A brace on a square-rigged ship is a rope (line) used to rotate a yard around the mast, to allow the ship to sail at different angles to the wind. Braces are always used in pairs, one at each end of a yard (yardarm), termed port brace and starboard brace of a given yard or sail (e.g., the starboard main-brace is the brace fixed to the right end of the yard of the main sail).

The braces are fixed to the outer ends of the yards, and are led to the deck as far aft as possible, to allow the crew to haul on them. The lower yards' braces can usually run directly to the deck, but to do so with those higher up would mean that most of the force was pulling downwards rather than backwards. Instead, the braces for the upper yards run to another mast and thence to the deck. On the aftermost mast, this may mean they have to be led forwards instead of backwards. Braces from the aftermost mast that run to the very stern of the ship often pass through blocks attached to short outriggers projecting from the side of the ship in order to improve their lead. These projections are called bumkins and can be seen in the picture.

In many ways, braces are the equivalent of a modern yacht's sheets. However, where adjusting a sail on a yacht is a simple operation performed often, tacking or wearing ship using the braces usually requires the entire crew to be called to "bracing stations". This is because the braces carry heavy loads but have few blocks and hence each one needs many people hauling, and because most ships with braces have many sails and hence many such teams. For this reason, all manoeuvres require plenty of notice (one reason falling overboard is especially to be avoided from such a ship) and routine course changes may be planned well in advance for a time when as few of the crew as possible wish to be asleep.

The sails on a tall ship's mast must all be turned together, because of all the gear that runs between them. The rate of turn is set by the course, the heaviest yard and hence the most difficult to move. The teams on the other braces for that mast must watch the course and keep their own yard in line with it. The braces may be marked with leather tags or twine seizings to indicate the centre ("square") position and the two extremes, though these marks may not always be accurate due to stretch in the line.

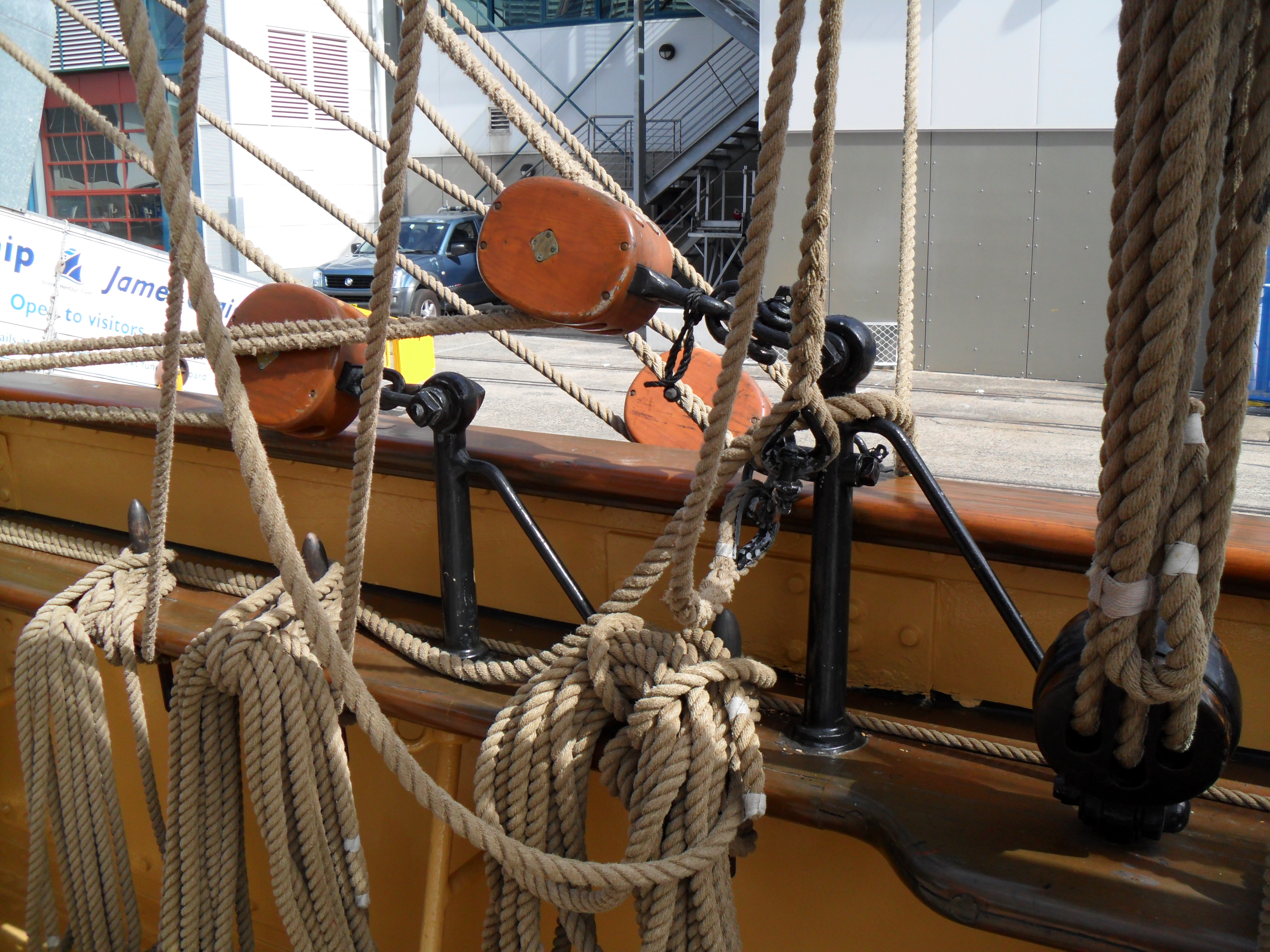
Starboard fore mast yard brace pulley blocks and brackets beside main mast shroud

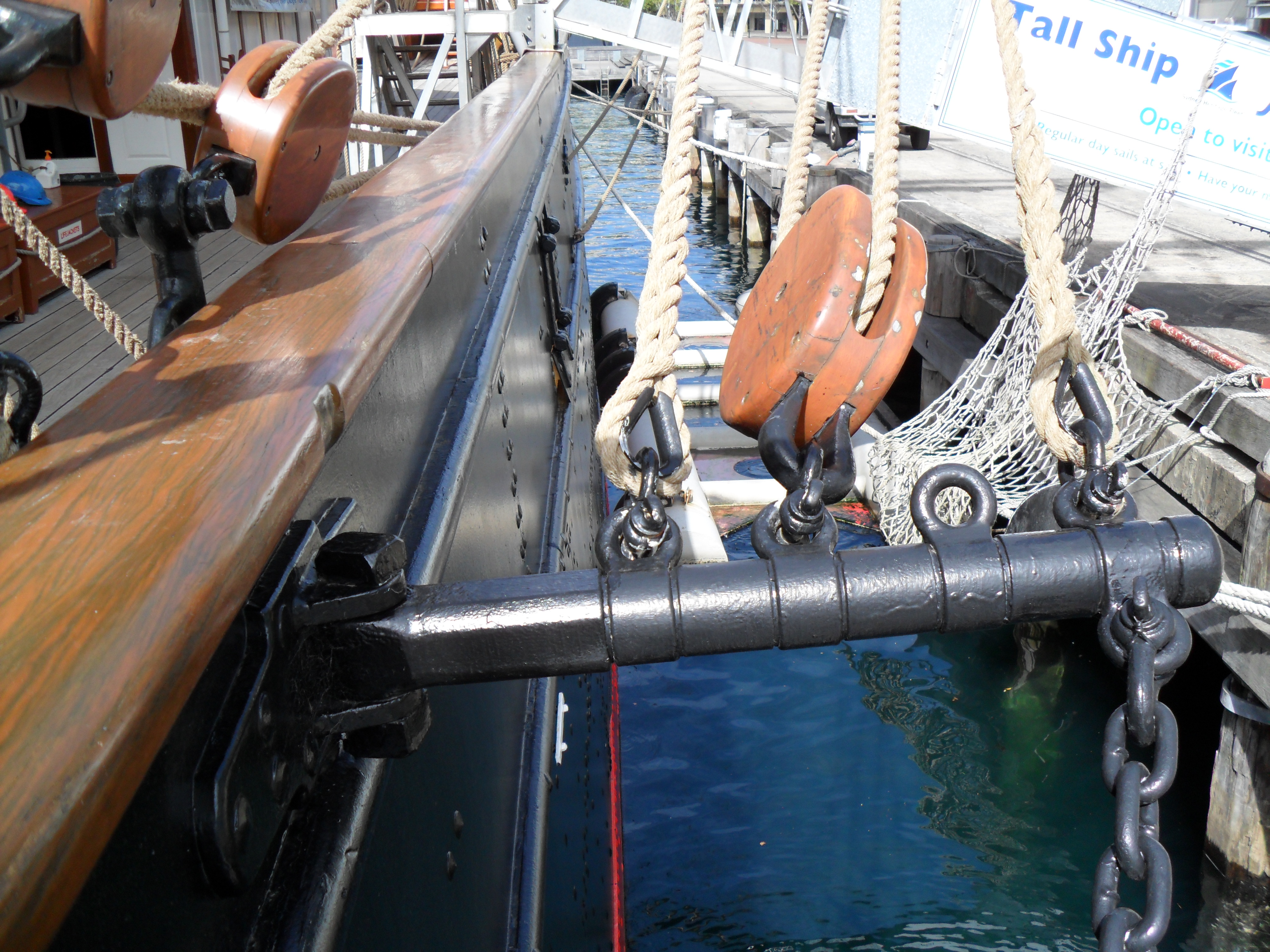
Brace ropes, blocks and attachments on James Craig (barque)

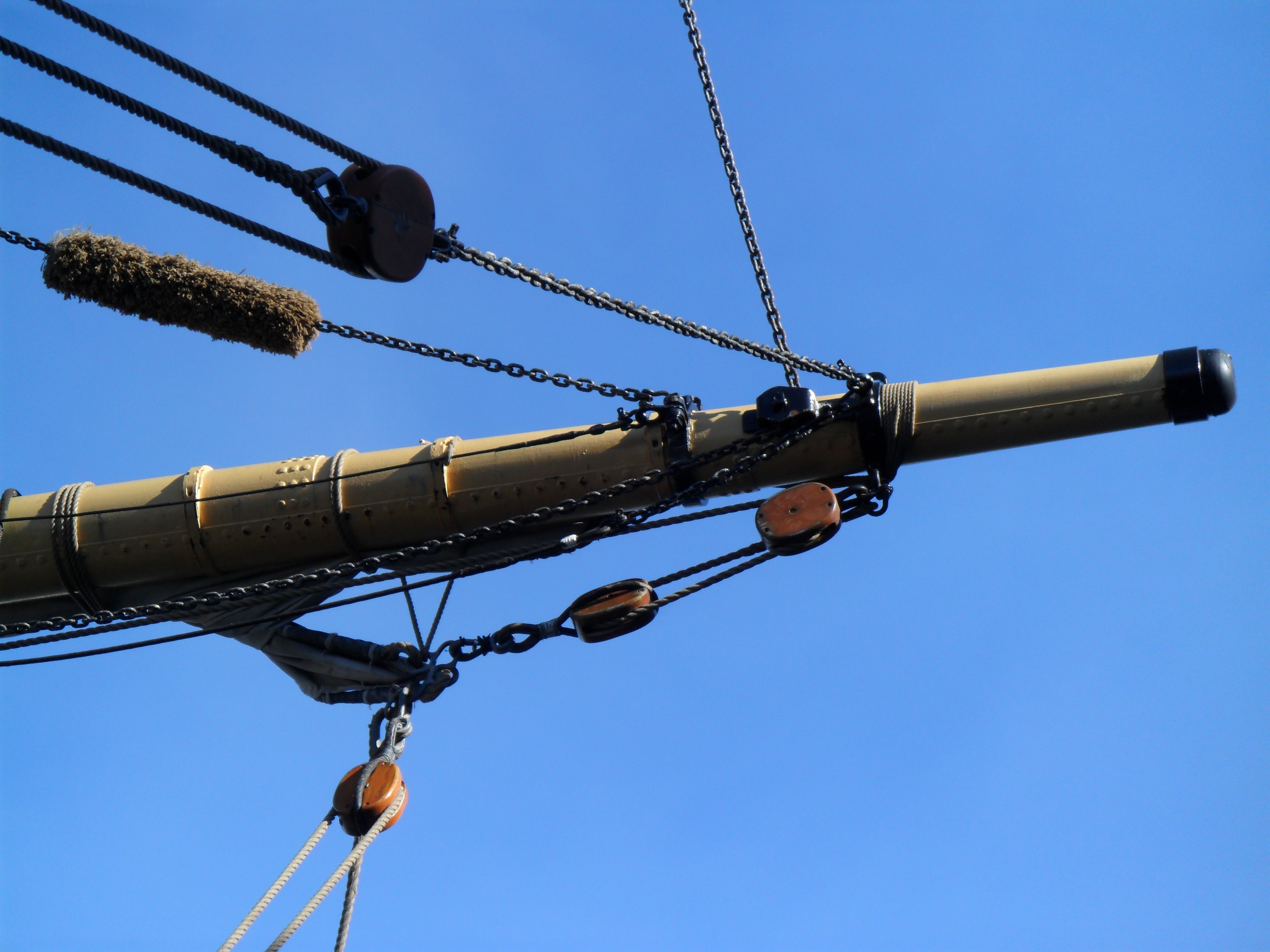
Main sail brace(starboard) block, shown toward top of photo

== See also ==
- Glossary of nautical terms (disambiguation)
