= Halyard =

Rope used to hoist a sail

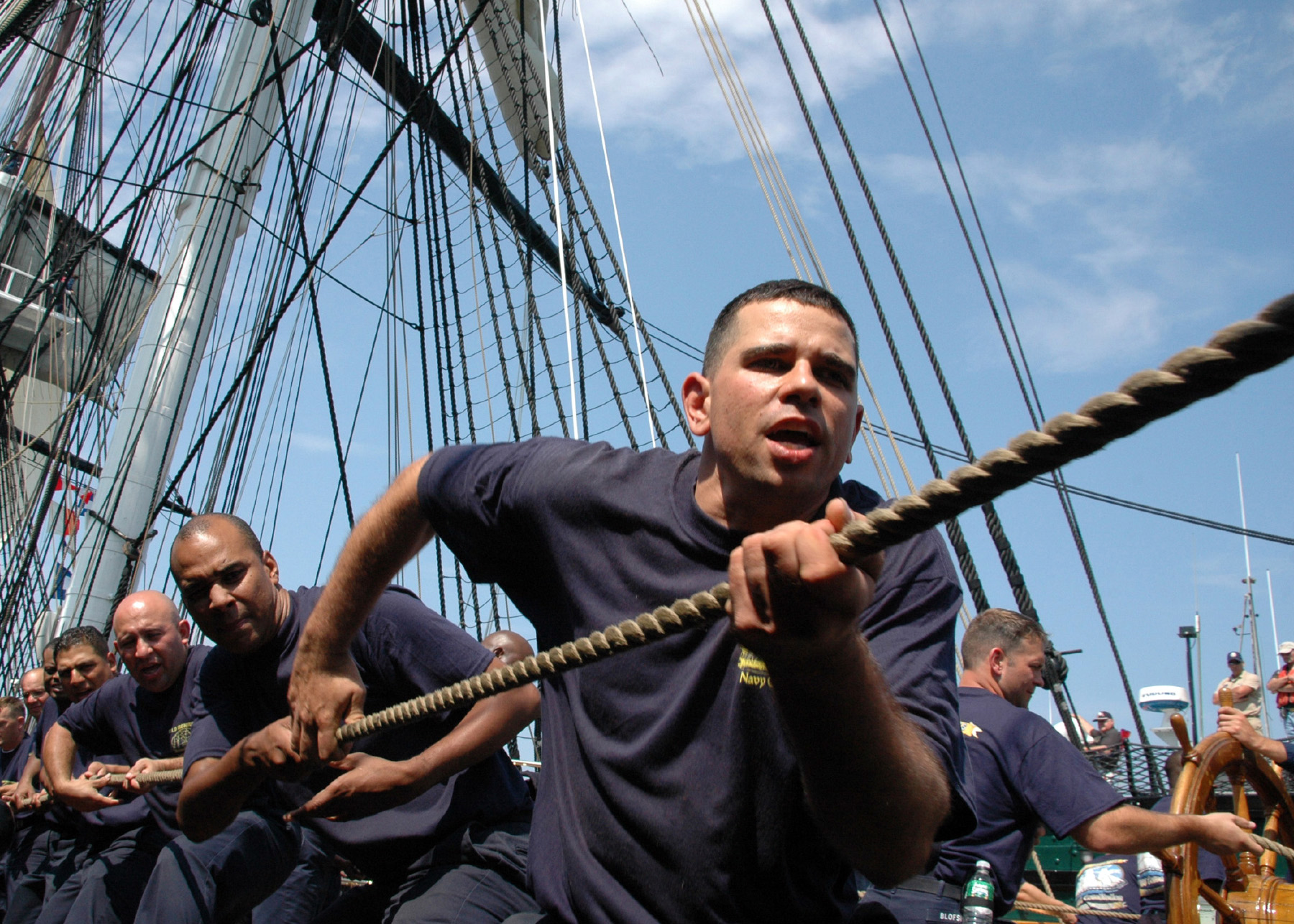
Sailors hauling a halyard

In sailing, a halyard or halliard is a line (rope) that is used to hoist a ladder, sail, flag or yard. The term "halyard" derives from the Middle English halier ("rope to haul with"), with the last syllable referring to a yard, the spar located at the head of a square sail (and some other sail types). Halyards, like most other parts of the running rigging, were classically made of natural fibre like manila or hemp.

== Sail types ==
- A square rig sail with a halyard is mounted on a lifting yard that is free to slide on a short section of the mast. The halyard is used to raise (hail or hal) the yard when setting the sail.
- A gaff rigged sail has two; a throat halyard to lift the end of the gaff nearer the mast, and a peak halyard to lift the outer end.
- A more modern triangular (Bermuda or "Marconi") sail has only one halyard which is attached at its uppermost point (the head).

== Fastenings ==
Halyards can be attached a number of ways to the head of a triangular sail. The most common methods are as follows:

1. A shackle through a headboard on the sail.
2. A bowline through a hole in the head.
3. A half hitch with a figure-eight knot, preferred over a bowline because it allows the sail to get closer to the top of the mast.

The other end of the halyard is usually attached to the mast at its foot by way of a cleat. It is convention in some places to fasten the main halyard (for the mainsail) on the starboard side of the mast and the jib halyard to the port side. This allows quicker access to the lines in a time-critical situation.

== Jumping/sweating the halyard ==
"Jumping the halyard" is a technique used to raise a large sail quickly by employing a few crew members to work simultaneously on the halyard. The person jumping stands next to the mast and manually grabs the halyard as high as they can (sometimes this necessitates jumping) and pulling it down as fast and far as possible. While this crew member reaches for the next heave, a second crew member 'tails' or takes up the slack created by the jumper, on a winch. When the person jumping can no longer pull up the sail simply by hanging on the halyard, they must "sweat" the line.

To "sweat" the halyard is to take as much slack out of it as possible. This may be done with a winch, or manually. To manually sweat a halyard, the sweater grasps the line and, in a fluid motion, hauls it laterally towards themself, then down toward the deck, letting the tailer take up the new slack.
