= Units of textile measurement =

Systems for measuring textiles

Textile fibers, threads, yarns and fabrics are measured in a multiplicity of units.

- A fiber is measured in terms of linear mass density, the weight of a given length of fiber. Various units are used to refer to the measurement of a fiber, such as: the denier and tex (linear mass density of fibers), super S (fineness of wool fiber), worsted count, woolen count, linen count (wet spun) (or Number English (Ne)), cotton count (or Number English (Ne)), Number metric (Nm) and yield (the reciprocal of denier and tex).
- A yarn or thread, a spun agglomeration of fibers used for knitting, weaving or sewing, is measured in terms of count and yarn density.
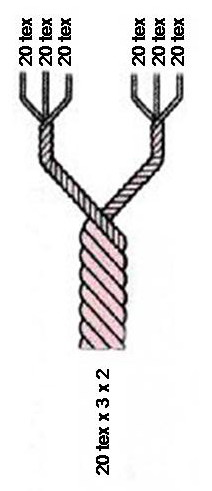
  Thread made from two threads plied together, each consisting of three yarns
- Fabric, material typically produced by weaving, knitting or knotting textile fibers, yarns or threads, is normally measured by weight, g/m^{2} , thread count (a measure of the coarseness or fineness of fabric), in ends per inch (e.p.i) and picks per inch (p.p.i).

== Fibers ==
=== Micronaire ===
Micronaire is a measure of the air permeability of cotton fiber and is an indication of fineness and maturity. Micronaire affects various aspects of cotton processing.

=== Micron ===
One millionth of a metre, or one thousandth of a millimetre; about one-fourth the width of a strand of spider silk.

Cotton Bale Size

Cotton lint is usually measured in bales, although there is no standard and the bale size may vary country to country. For example, in the United States it measures approximately 0.48 cubic metres (17 ft^{3}) and weighs 226.8 kg (500 lb). In India, a bale equals 170 kg (370 lb).

=== S or super S number ===
Not a true unit of measure, S or super S number is an index of the fineness of wool fiber and is most commonly seen as a label on wool apparel, fabric, and yarn.

== Slivers, tops and rovings ==
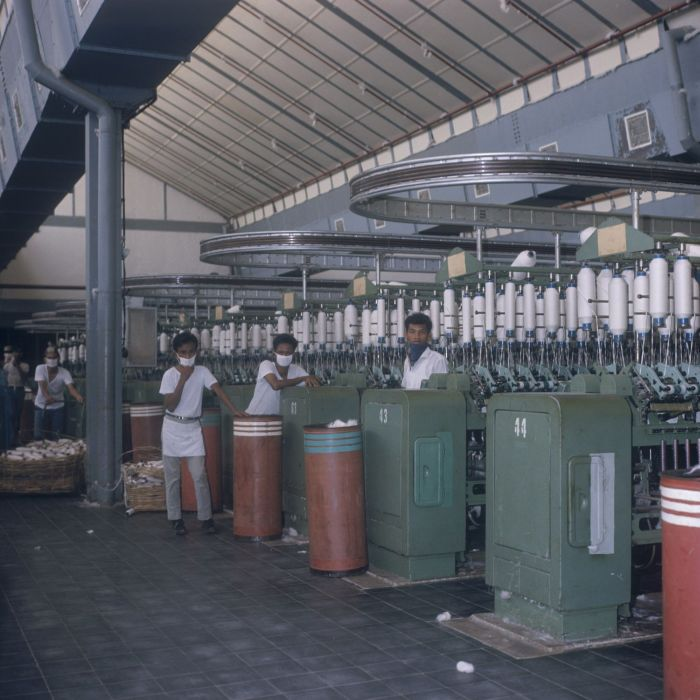
Yarn spinning factory

Slivers, tops and rovings are terms used in the worsted process. The sliver come off the card, tops come after the comb, rovings come before a yarn, and all have a heavier linear density.

=== Grams per metre ===
If the metric system is in use the linear density of slivers and tops is given in grams per metre. Tops destined for machine processing are typically 20 grams per metre.

== Yarn and thread ==
=== Twist ===
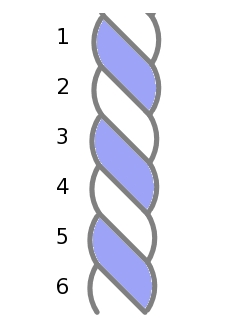
Image showing how to determine the number of twists per inch in a piece of yarn

==== Twists per inch ====
Number of twists per inch.

==== Twists per metre ====
Number of twists per metre.

=== Linear density ===
There are two systems used for presenting linear density, direct and indirect. When the direct method is used, the length is fixed and the weight of yarn is measured; for example, tex gives the weight in grams of one thousand metres of yarn. An indirect method fixes the weight and gives the length of yarn created.

==== Units ====
The textile industry has a long history and there are various units in use. Tex is more likely to be used in Canada and Continental Europe, while denier remains more common in the United States.

- tex: Grams per 1,000 metres of yarn. Tex is a direct measure of linear density.
- den or D (denier): Grams per 9,000 metres of yarn. Den is a direct measure of linear density.
- dtex (deci-tex, decitex): Grams per 10,000 metres of yarn. Dtex is a direct measure of linear density.
- gr/yard: Grains per yard of yarn. Gr/yard is a direct measure of linear density, but is rarely used in the modern textile industry.
- ECC or NeC or Ne (English Cotton Count): The number of 840 yd lengths per pound. ECC is an indirect measure of linear density. It is the number of hanks of skein material that weighs 1 lb. Under this system, the higher the number, the finer the yarn. In the United States cotton counts between 1 and 20 are referred to as coarse counts.
- NeK or NeW (Worsted Count): The number of 560 yd lengths per 1 lb of yarn. NeK is an indirect measure of linear density. NeK is also referred to as the spinning count.
- NeL or Lea (Linen Count): The number of 300 yd lengths per 1 lb of yarn. NeL is an indirect measure of linear density.
- NeS (Woollen Count or Yorkshire Skeins Woollen): The number of 256 yd lengths per 1 lb of yarn. NeS is an indirect measure of linear density. One of the best known of the many different woolen yarn counts.

=== Denier ===
Denier (/ˈdɛniər/), often abbreviated den or D, is a unit measuring individual thread density.

In modern usage, it is defined as grams per 9,000 linear thread-meters. The unit originates with the medieval French denier coin.

A distinction can be made between filament and total measurements. The former measures a single filament of fiber (commonly called denier per filament (DPF)), whereas the second measures a yarn.

To measure a fiber's denier count, generally a sample of 900 meters is weighed, and the result is multiplied by ten. For single fibers, instead of weighing, a machine called a vibroscope is used. A known length of the fiber (usually 20mm) is set to vibrate, and its fundamental frequency measured, allowing the calculation of the mass and thus the linear density.

=== Yarn length ===
Given the linear density and weight the yarn length can be calculated; for example:

l/m = 1693 × l_{m}/Nec × m/kg, where l/m is the yarn length in metres, l_{m}/Nec is the English cotton count and m/kg is the yarn weight in kilograms.

== Fabrics ==
=== Grams per square metre g/m^{2} ===
Fabric weight is measured in grams per square metre or g/m^{2} (sometimes abbreviated as GSM). g/m^{2} is the metric measurement of the weight of a fabric—it is a critical parameter for any textile product. Fabric weight may affect many physical properties of the fabric such as density, thickness and strength.

Typically, cheap T-shirt fabric is approximately 150 g/m^{2}. The g/m^{2} of fabric helps in determining the consumption, cost and application. Higher g/m^{2} corresponds to thicker and heavier construction.

=== Mommes ===
Mommes (mm), traditionally used to measure silk fabrics, the weight in pounds of a piece of fabric if it were sized 45 inches by 100 yards.

The momme is based on the standard width of silk of 45in wide (though silk is regularly woven in 55-inch (1.4 m) widths and uncommonly in larger widths).

The usual range of momme weight for different weaves of silk are:

- Habutai—5 to 16 mm
- Chiffon—6 to 8 mm (can be made in double thickness, i.e. 12 to 16 mm)
- Crepe de Chine—12 to 16 mm
- Gauze—3 to 5 mm
- Silk noil—35 to 40 mm (heavier silks appear more "wooly")
- Organza—4 to 6 mm
- Charmeuse—12 to 30 mm

The higher the weight in mommes, the more durable the weave and the more suitable it is for heavy-duty use.

=== Ends per inch ===
Ends per inch (EPI or e.p.i.) is the number of warp threads per inch of woven fabric. In general, the higher the ends per inch, the finer the fabric is.

Ends per inch is very commonly used by weavers who must use the number of ends per inch in order to pick the right reed to weave with. The number of ends per inch varies on the pattern to be woven and the thickness of the thread. The number of times the thread can be wrapped around a ruler in adjacent turns over an inch is called the wraps per inch. Plain weaves generally use half the number of wraps per inch for the number of ends per inch, whereas denser weaves like a twill weave will use a higher ratio like two-thirds of the number of wraps per inch. Finer threads require more threads per inch than thick ones and thus result in a higher number of ends per inch.

The number of ends per inch in a piece of woven cloth varies depending on the stage of manufacture. Before the cloth is woven, the warp has a certain number of ends per inch, which is directly related to the size reed being used. After weaving, the number of ends per inch will increase, and it will increase again after being washed. This increase in the number of ends per inch (and picks per inch) and shrinkage in the size of the fabric is known as the take-up. The take-up depends on many factors, including the material and how tightly the cloth is woven. Tightly woven fabric shrinks more (and thus the number of ends per inch increases more) than loosely woven fabric, as do more elastic yarns and fibers.

=== Picks per inch ===
Picks per inch (or p.p.i.) is the number of weft threads per inch of woven fabric. A pick is a single weft thread, hence the term. In general, the higher the picks per inch, the finer is the fabric.

=== Courses and wales ===
Loops are the building blocks of knitted fabrics, and courses and wales in knitted fabrics are importantly similar to ends and pick in woven fabrics. The knitting structure is formed by intermeshing the loops in consecutive rows.

- Courses are the total number of horizontal rows measured in per inch or per centimetre. The course is a horizontal row of loops formed by all the adjacent needles during one revolution. Course length is obtained by multiplying loop length with the number of needles involved in the production of the course.
- Wales are the number of vertical columns measured in per inch or per centimetre.
- Stitch or loop density is the total number of loops in a unit area such as per square centimetre or per square inch.
- Stitch/loop length Loop length is the length of yarn contained to form a loop.

=== Air permeability ===
Air permeability is a measure of the ability of air to pass through a fabric. Air permeability is defined as "the volume of air in cubic centimetres (cm^{3}) which is passed through in one second through 100 cm^{2} of the fabric at a pressure difference of 10 cm head of water", also known as the Gurley unit. It is standardized by, among others, norm ASTM D737-18 and norm ISO 9237-1995.

Factors that affect air permeability include porosity, fabric thickness and construction, yarn density, twist, crimp, layering, and moisture within the fabric.

The concept of air permeability is important for the design of active wear and insect netting.

=== Thread count in North America ===
Thread count, also called threadcount or threads per inch (TPI), is a measure of the coarseness or fineness of fabric. It is almost exclusively used in North America, and not normally used in textile manufacturing. It is a Term of Art used in marketing some types of fabric (woven bedlinen, woven shirting.) It is measured by counting the number of threads contained in one square inch of fabric or one square centimetre, including both the length (warp) and width (weft) threads. The thread count is the number of threads counted along two sides (up and across) of the square inch, added together.

There is a common misconception that thread count is an important consideration when purchasing bedding. However, linen experts claim that beyond a thread count of 400, there is no difference in quality. The amount of thread that can fit into a square inch of fabric is limited, suggesting that bedding beyond 400 count is likely a marketing strategy. Inflated thread counts are usually the result of including the number of strands in a twisted yarn in the claimed thread count.

==== Industry standard in North America ====
Thread count is often used as a measure of fabric quality, thus "standard" cotton thread counts are around 150 while "good-quality" sheets start at 180 and a count of 200 or higher is considered "percale". Some (but not all) extremely high thread counts (typically over 500) mislead as they usually count the individual threads in "plied" yarns (a yarn that is made by twisting together multiple finer threads). For marketing purposes, a fabric with 250 two-ply yarns in both the vertical and horizontal direction could have the component threads counted to a 1,000 thread count although according to the USA's National Textile Association (NTA), which cites the international standards group ASTM International, accepted industry practice is to count each thread as one, even threads spun as two- or three-ply yarn. The USA's Federal Trade Commission in an August 2005 letter to the NTA agreed that consumers "could be deceived or misled" by inflated thread counts.

In 2002, ASTM proposed a definition for "thread count" that has been called "the industry's first formal definition for thread count". A small number of the ASTM committee argued for the higher yarn count number obtained by counting each single yarn in a plied yarn and cited as authority the provision relating to woven fabric in the Harmonized Tariff Schedule of the United States, which states each ply should be counted as one using the "average yarn number." In 2017, the Federal Trade Commission issued a General Exclusion Order barring entry of woven textile fabrics and products marked with inflated thread counts. The inflated thread counts were deemed false advertising under section 43 of the Lanham Act, 15 U.S.C. 1125(a)(1)(B).

== Bibliography ==
- Collier, Ann M (1970). A Handbook of Textiles. Pergamon Press. p. 258. ISBN 0-08-018057-4.
- Curtis, H P (1921). Glossary of Textile Terms. Arthur Roberts Black Book. Manchester: Marsden & Company, Ltd.
