= Jean-Marie Duhamel =

French mathematician and physicist

Jean-Marie Constant Duhamel
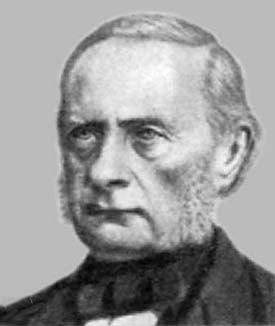
- Born: 5 February 1797; Saint-Malo, Ille-et-Vilaine, France
- Died: 29 April 1872 (aged 75); Paris, France
- Known for: Duhamel's formula Duhamel's integral Duhamel's principle Vibroscope
- Scientific career
- Fields: Mathematics; Physics
- Thesis: De l'influence du double mouvement des planètes sur les températures de leurs différents points (1834)

Jean-Marie Constant Duhamel (/ˌdjuːəˈmɛl/; French: [dy.amɛl]; 5 February 1797 – 29 April 1872) was a French mathematician and physicist.

His studies were affected by the troubles of the Napoleonic era. He went on to form his own school École Sainte-Barbe. Duhamel's principle, a method of obtaining solutions to inhomogeneous linear evolution equations, is named after him. He was primarily a mathematician but did studies on the mathematics of heat, mechanics, and acoustics. He also did work in calculus using infinitesimals. Duhamel's theorem for infinitesimals says that the sum of a series of infinitesimals is unchanged by replacing the infinitesimal with its principal part.

In 1853 he published about an early recording device he called a vibroscope. Like other similar devices, the vibroscope was a type of measuring device similar to an oscilloscope, and could not play back the etchings it recorded.

== Honours ==
- 19617 Duhamel, asteroid named after him

== See also ==
- Duhamel two-point function
- Raabe–Duhamel's test
