= Duhamel's integral =

Integral used in the theory of vibrations

In theory of vibrations, Duhamel's integral is a way of calculating the response of linear systems and structures to arbitrary time-varying external perturbation. It is named after Jean-Marie Duhamel. It is the convolution of a linear system's impulse response function with the input function.

== Introduction ==
=== Background ===
The response of a linear, viscously-damped, single degree of freedom (SDOF) system to a time-varying mechanical excitation p(t) is given by the following second-order ordinary differential equation

$$m\frac{{d^2 x(t)}}{{dt^2 }} + c\frac{{dx(t)}}{{dt}} + kx(t) = p(t)$$

where m is the (equivalent) mass, x stands for the amplitude of vibration, t for time, c for the viscous damping coefficient, and k for the stiffness of the system or structure.

If a system initially rests at its equilibrium position, from where it is acted upon by a unit-impulse at the instance t=0, i.e., p(t) in the equation above is a Dirac delta function δ(t), $x(0) = \left. \frac{dx}{dt} \right|_{t = 0} = 0$, then by solving the differential equation one can get a fundamental solution (known as a unit-impulse response function)

$$h(t)=
\begin{cases}
\frac{1}{{m\omega _d }}e^{ - \varsigma \omega _n t} \sin \omega _d t, & t > 0 \\
0, & t < 0
\end{cases}$$

where $\varsigma = \frac{c}{2\sqrt{k m}}$ is called the damping ratio of the system, $\omega _n=\sqrt{\frac{k}{m}}$ is the natural angular frequency of the undamped system (when c=0) and $\omega _d = \omega _n \sqrt {1 - \varsigma ^2 }$ is the angular frequency when damping effect is taken into account (when $c \ne 0$). If the impulse happens at t=τ instead of t=0, i.e. $p(t)=\delta (t - \tau )$, the impulse response is

$h(t - \tau ) = \frac{1}{{m\omega _d }}e^{ - \varsigma \omega _n (t - \tau )} \sin [\omega _d (t - \tau )]$，$t \ge \tau$

=== Conclusion ===
Regarding the arbitrarily varying excitation p(t) as a superposition of a series of impulses:

$$p(t) \approx \sum_{\tau <t} {p(\tau ) \cdot \Delta \tau  \cdot \delta } (t - \tau )$$

then it is known from the linearity of system that the overall response can also be broken down into the superposition of a series of impulse-responses:

$$x(t) \approx \sum_{\tau <t} {p(\tau ) \cdot \Delta \tau  \cdot h} (t - \tau )$$

Letting $\Delta \tau \to 0$, and replacing the summation by integration, the above equation is strictly valid

$$x(t) = \int_0^t {p(\tau )h(t - \tau )d\tau }$$

Substituting the expression of h(t-τ) into the above equation leads to the general expression of Duhamel's integral

$$x(t) = \frac{1}{{m\omega _d }}\int_0^t {p(\tau )e^{ - \varsigma \omega _n (t - \tau )} \sin [\omega _d (t - \tau )]d\tau }$$

=== Mathematical proof ===
The above SDOF dynamic equilibrium equation in the case p(t)=0 is the homogeneous equation:

$\frac{{d^2 x(t)}}{{dt^2 }} + \bar{c}\frac{{dx(t)}}{{dt}} + \bar{k}x(t) = 0$, where $\bar{c}=\frac{c}{m},\bar{k}=\frac{k}{m}$

The solution of this equation is:

$$x_h(t) = C_1\cdot e^{ -\frac{1}{2} \left(\bar{c}+\sqrt{\bar{c}^2-4\cdot \bar{k}} \right)t}+C_2\cdot e^{ \frac{1}{2} \left(-\bar{c}+\sqrt{\bar{c}^2-4\cdot \bar{k}}\right)t}$$

The substitution: $A = \frac{1}{2}\left(\bar{c}-\sqrt{\bar{c}^2-4\bar{k}}\right), \; B=\frac{1}{2}\left(\bar{c}+\sqrt{\bar{c}^2-4\bar{k}}\right), \; P=\sqrt{\bar{c}^2-4\bar{k}}, \; P=B-A$ leads to:

$$x_h(t) = C_1 e^{ -B\cdot t} \; + \; C_2 e^{ -A\cdot t}$$

One partial solution of the non-homogeneous equation: $\frac{d^2 x(t)}{dt^2} + \bar{c}\frac{dx(t)}{dt} + \bar{k}x(t) = \bar p(t)$, where $\bar p(t) = \frac{p(t)}{m}$, could be obtained by the Lagrangian method for deriving partial solution of non-homogeneous ordinary differential equations.

This solution has the form:

$$x_p(t) = \frac{\int{\bar{p(t)}\cdot e^{At}dt}\cdot e^{-At}-\int{\bar{p(t)}\cdot e^{Bt}dt}\cdot e^{-Bt}}{P}$$

Now substituting:$\left. \int {\bar{p(t)} \cdot e^{At}dt} \right|_{t=z}=Q_z, \left. \int {\bar{p(t)} \cdot e^{Bt}dt}\right|_{t=z}=R_z$,where $\left.\int x(t)dt\right|_{t=z}$ is the primitive of x(t) computed at t=z, in the case z=t this integral is the primitive itself, yields:

$$x_p(t) = \frac{Q_t\cdot e^{-At}-R_t\cdot e^{-Bt}}{P}$$

Finally the general solution of the above non-homogeneous equation is represented as:

$$x(t)=x_h(t)+x_p(t)=C_1\cdot e^{ -B t}+C_2\cdot e^{ -A t} +\frac{Q_t\cdot e^{-At}-R_t\cdot e^{-Bt}}{P}$$

with time derivative:

$\frac{dx}{dt} = -A e^{-At} \cdot C_2-B e^{-Bt} \cdot C_1 + \frac{1}{P} \left[\dot{Q_t}\cdot e^{-At}-A Q_t\cdot e^{-At}-\dot{R_t}\cdot e^{-Bt}+B R_t\cdot e^{-Bt}\right]$, where $\dot{Q_t}=p(t)\cdot e^{At},\dot{R_t}=p(t)\cdot e^{Bt}$

In order to find the unknown constants $C_1, C_2$, zero initial conditions will be applied:

$x(t)|_{t=0} = 0: C_1+C_2+\frac{Q_0\cdot 1-R_0\cdot 1}{P}=0$ ⇒ $C_1+C_2=\frac{R_0-Q_0}{P}$
$\left. \frac{dx}{dt} \right|_{t=0} = 0: -A\cdot C_2-B\cdot C_1 + \frac{1}{P}\cdot [-A\cdot Q_0+B\cdot R_0]=0$ ⇒ $A\cdot C_2+B\cdot C_1=\frac{1}{P}\cdot [B\cdot R_0-A\cdot Q_0]$

Now combining both initial conditions together, the next system of equations is observed:

$$\left.{\begin{alignat}{5}
C_1 &&\; + &&\; C_2 &&\; = &&\; \frac{R_0-Q_0}{P} & \\
B\cdot C_1 &&\; + &&\; A\cdot C_2 &&\; = &&\; \frac{1}{P}\cdot [B\cdot R_0-A\cdot Q_0]\end{alignat}} \right|{\begin{alignat}{5}
C_1 &&\; = &&\; \frac{R_0}{P} & \\
C_2 &&\; = &&\; -\frac{Q_0}{P}\end{alignat}}$$

The back substitution of the constants $C_1$ and $C_2$ into the above expression for x(t) yields:

$$x(t)=\frac{Q_t-Q_0}{P}\cdot e^{ -A\cdot t}-\frac{R_t-R_0}{P}\cdot e^{ -B\cdot t}$$

Replacing $Q_t-Q_0$ and $R_t-R_0$ (the difference between the primitives at t=t and t=0) with definite integrals (by another variable τ) will reveal the general solution with zero initial conditions, namely:

$$x(t) = \frac{1}{P}\cdot \left[ \int_0^t{\bar{p}(\tau) \cdot e^{A\tau}d\tau}\cdot e^{-At}-\int_0^t{\bar p(\tau) \cdot e^{B\tau}d\tau}\cdot e^{-Bt} \right]$$

Finally substituting $c=2\xi\omega m, \; k=\omega^2m$, accordingly $\bar{c}=2\xi\omega, \bar{k}=\omega^2$, where ξ<1 yields:

$P=2\omega_D i, \; A=\xi\omega-\omega_D i, \; B=\xi\omega+\omega_D i$, where $\omega_D=\omega\cdot \sqrt{1-\xi^2}$ and i is the imaginary unit.

Substituting this expressions into the above general solution with zero initial conditions and using the Euler's exponential formula will lead to canceling out the imaginary terms and reveals the Duhamel's solution:

$$x(t)=\frac{1}{\omega_D}\int_0^t {\bar{p}(\tau) e^{-\xi\omega(t-\tau)} \sin(\omega_D(t-\tau))d\tau}$$

== See also ==
- Duhamel's principle
