= Duhamel's principle =

Method for solving partial differential equations

In mathematics, and more specifically in partial differential equations, Duhamel's principle is a general method for obtaining solutions to inhomogeneous linear evolution equations like the heat equation, wave equation, and vibrating plate equation. It is named after Jean-Marie Duhamel who first applied the principle to the inhomogeneous heat equation that models, for instance, the distribution of heat in a thin plate which is heated from beneath. For linear evolution equations without spatial dependency, such as a harmonic oscillator, Duhamel's principle reduces to the method of variation of parameters technique for solving linear inhomogeneous ordinary differential equations. It is also an indispensable tool in the study of nonlinear partial differential equations such as the Navier–Stokes equations and nonlinear Schrödinger equation where one treats the nonlinearity as an inhomogeneity.

The philosophy underlying Duhamel's principle is that it is possible to go from solutions of the Cauchy problem (or initial value problem) to solutions of the inhomogeneous problem. Consider, for instance, the example of the heat equation modeling the distribution of heat energy u in R^{n}. Indicating by u_{t} (x, t) the time derivative of u(x, t), the initial value problem is
$$\begin{cases}
u_t(x,t) - \Delta u(x,t) = 0 &(x,t)\in \R^n\times (0,\infty)\\
u(x,0) = g(x) & x\in \R^n
\end{cases}$$
where g is the initial heat distribution. By contrast, the inhomogeneous problem for the heat equation,
$$\begin{cases}
u_t(x,t) -\Delta u(x,t) = f(x,t) &(x,t)\in \R^n\times (0,\infty)\\
u(x,0) = 0 & x\in \R^n
\end{cases}$$
corresponds to adding an external heat energy f (x, t) dt at each point. Intuitively, one can think of the inhomogeneous problem as a set of homogeneous problems each starting afresh at a different time slice t = t_{0}. By linearity, one can add up (integrate) the resulting solutions through time t_{0} and obtain the solution for the inhomogeneous problem. This is the essence of Duhamel's principle.

== General considerations ==
Formally, consider a linear inhomogeneous evolution equation for a function
$$u:D\times(0,\infty)\to \R$$
with spatial domain D in R^{n}, of the form
$$\begin{cases}
u_t(x,t) -Lu(x,t) = f(x,t) &(x,t)\in D\times (0,\infty)\\
u|_{\partial D} = 0 &\\
u(x,0) = 0 & x\in D,
\end{cases}$$
where L is a linear differential operator that involves no time derivatives.

Duhamel's principle is, formally, that the solution to this problem is
$$u(x,t) = \int_0^t (P^sf)(x,t)\,ds$$
where P^{s}f is the solution of the problem where the source term (inhomogenuity) is injected into the homogenous problem at time $s$,
$$\begin{cases}
v_t - Lv = 0 & (x,t)\in D\times (s,\infty)\\
v|_{\partial D} = 0 &\\
v(x,s) = f(x,s) & x\in D.
\end{cases}$$
Thus, the integrand is the retarded solution $P^sf(x,t)$, evaluated at time t, representing the effect, at the later time t, of an infinitesimal force $f(x,s)\,ds$ applied at time s. (The operator $P^s$ can be thought of as an inverse of the operator $\partial_t - L$ for the Cauchy problem with initial condition $f(x,s)$.)

Duhamel's principle also holds for linear systems (with vector-valued functions u), and this in turn furnishes a generalization to higher t derivatives, such as those appearing in the wave equation (see below). Validity of the principle depends on being able to solve the homogeneous problem in an appropriate function space and that the solution should exhibit reasonable dependence on parameters so that the integral is well-defined. Precise analytic conditions on u and f depend on the particular application.

== Examples ==
=== Wave equation ===
The linear wave equation models the displacement u of an idealized dispersionless one-dimensional string, in terms of derivatives with respect to time t and space x:

$$\frac{\partial^2 u}{\partial t^2}-c^2\frac{\partial^2 u}{\partial x^2}=f(x,t).$$

The function f (x, t), in natural units, represents an external force applied to string at the position (x, t). In order to be a suitable physical model for nature, it should be possible to solve it for any initial state that the string is in, specified by its initial displacement and velocity:

$$u(x,0)=u_0(x),\qquad \frac{\partial u}{\partial t}(x,0) = v_0(x).$$

More generally, we should be able to solve the equation with data specified on any t = constant = T slice:

$$u(x,T)=u_T(x),\qquad \frac{\partial u}{\partial t}(x,T)=v_T(x).$$

To evolve a solution from any given time slice T to T + dT, the contribution of the force must be added to the solution. That contribution comes from changing the velocity of the string by f (x, T) dT. That is, to get the solution at time T + dT from the solution at time T, we must add to it a new (forward) solution of the homogeneous (no external forces) wave equation

$$\frac{\partial^2 U}{\partial t^2}-c^2\frac{\partial^2 U}{\partial x^2} = 0$$

with initial conditions

$$U(x,T)=0,\qquad \frac{\partial U}{\partial t}(x,T)=f(x,T) dT.$$

A solution to this equation is achieved by straightforward integration:

$$U(x,t) = \left(\frac{1}{2c}\int_{x-c(t-T)}^{x+c(t-T)} f(\xi,T)\,d\xi\right)\,dT$$

(The expression in parentheses is just $P^Tf(x,t)$ in the notation of the general method above.) So a solution of the original initial value problem is obtained by starting with a solution to the problem with the same prescribed initial values problem but with zero initial displacement, and adding to that (integrating) the contributions from the added force in the time intervals from T to T+dT:

$$u(x,t) = \frac{1}{2}\left[u_0(x+ct)+ u_0(x-ct)\right]+ \frac{1}{2c}\int_{x-ct}^{x+ct} v_0(y) dy + \frac{1}{2c}\int_0^t\int_{x-c(t-T)}^{x+c(t-T)} f(\xi,T)\,d\xi\,dT.$$

=== Constant-coefficient linear ODE ===
Duhamel's principle is the result that the solution to an inhomogeneous, linear, partial differential equation can be solved by first finding the solution for a step input, and then superposing using Duhamel's integral. Suppose we have a constant coefficient, m-th order inhomogeneous ordinary differential equation.
$$P(\partial_t)u(t) = F(t)$$
$$\partial_t^j u(0) = 0, \; 0 \leq j \leq m-1$$
where
$$P(\partial_t) := a_m \partial_t^m + \cdots + a_1 \partial_t + a_0,\; a_m \neq 0.$$

We can reduce this to the solution of a homogeneous ODE using the following method. All steps are done formally, ignoring necessary requirements for the solution to be well defined.

First let G solve
$$P(\partial_t)G = 0, \; \partial^j_t G(0) = 0, \quad 0\leq j \leq m-2, \; \partial_t^{m-1} G(0) = 1/a_m.$$

Define $H = G \chi_{[0,\infty)}$, with $\chi_{[0,\infty)}$ being the characteristic function of the interval $[0,\infty)$. Then we have

$$P(\partial_t) H = \delta$$

in the sense of distributions. Therefore

$$\begin{align}
u(t) &= (H \ast F)(t) \\
&= \int_0^\infty G(\tau)F(t-\tau)\,d\tau \\
&= \int_{-\infty}^t G(t-\tau)F(\tau)\, d\tau
\end{align}$$

solves the ODE.

=== Constant-coefficient linear PDE ===
More generally, suppose we have a constant coefficient inhomogeneous partial differential equation

$$P(\partial_t,D_x)u(t,x) = F(t,x)$$

where
$$D_x = \frac{1}{i} \frac{\partial}{\partial x}.$$

We can reduce this to the solution of a homogeneous ODE using the following method. All steps are done formally, ignoring necessary requirements for the solution to be well defined.

First, taking the Fourier transform in x we have
$$P(\partial_t,\xi)\hat u(t,\xi) = \hat F(t,\xi).$$

Assume that $P(\partial_t,\xi)$ is an m-th order ODE in t. Let $a_m$ be the coefficient of the highest order term of $P(\partial_t,\xi)$. Now for every $\xi$ let $G(t,\xi)$ solve
$$P(\partial_t,\xi)G(t,\xi) = 0, \; \partial^j_t G(0,\xi) = 0 \; \text{ for } 0\leq j \leq m-2, \; \partial_t^{m-1} G(0,\xi) = 1/a_m.$$

Define $H(t,\xi) = G(t,\xi) \chi_{[0,\infty)}(t)$. We then have
$$P(\partial_t,\xi) H(t,\xi) = \delta(t)$$
in the sense of distributions. Therefore
$$\begin{align}
\hat u(t,\xi) &= (H(\cdot,\xi) \ast \hat F(\cdot,\xi))(t) \\
&= \int_0^\infty G(\tau,\xi) \hat F(t-\tau,\xi)\,d\tau \\
&= \int_{-\infty}^t G(t-\tau,\xi) \hat F(\tau,\xi)\, d\tau
\end{align}$$
solves the PDE (after transforming back to x).

== Abstract semigroup formulation ==
Duhamel's principle is often expressed in the setting of the abstract Cauchy problem
$$u'(t)=Au(t)+f(t),\qquad u(0)=u_0,$$
where $A$ is a (typically unbounded) linear operator on a Banach space and generates a strongly continuous semigroup $(S(t))_{t\ge 0}$. In that case the solution is given by the variation-of-constants formula
$$u(t)=S(t)u_0+\int_0^t S(t-s)f(s)\,ds.$$

The second term is the Duhamel term. In this formulation, Duhamel's principle says that the solution of the inhomogeneous problem is obtained by superposing homogeneous evolutions started at all earlier times, with source term $f(s)$ acting as the initial impulse at time $s$.

This form of the principle is especially important in the theory of nonlinear evolution equations, where one rewrites a semilinear problem such as
$$u'(t)=Au(t)+N(u(t))$$
as the integral equation
$$u(t)=S(t)u_0+\int_0^t S(t-s)N(u(s))\,ds,$$
and then studies the resulting integral equation by fixed-point methods.

=== Green's-function formulation ===
Duhamel's principle can also be expressed in terms of a Green's function. Suppose $L$ is a linear evolution operator and $G(x,t;y,s)$ is its retarded Green's function, so that disturbances propagate only forward in time. If $u_{\mathrm{hom}}$ denotes the solution of the corresponding homogeneous problem with the given initial and boundary data, then the solution of
$$Lu=f$$
is formally
$$u(x,t)=u_{\mathrm{hom}}(x,t)+\int_0^t\int_D G(x,t;y,s)\,f(y,s)\,dy\,ds.$$

When the coefficients are independent of time, the kernel typically depends on $t-s$ rather than on $t$ and $s$ separately, and the Duhamel term becomes a convolution in time. In this sense, Duhamel's principle is the time-dependent analogue of solving an inhomogeneous equation by convolving the forcing term with a fundamental solution.

=== Regularity and mild solutions ===
In semigroup theory, the integral formula supplied by Duhamel's principle is also used to define a mild solution. If $A$ generates a strongly continuous semigroup $S(t)$, then
$$u(t)=S(t)u_0+\int_0^t S(t-s)f(s)\,ds$$
makes sense under weaker hypotheses than those required for differentiating the equation pointwise.

Thus, even when $u$ is not known a priori to be differentiable in time or to lie in the domain of $A$ for every $t$, the above formula may still define a well-posed solution in an integral sense; this is called a mild solution. Under stronger regularity assumptions on $u_0$ and $f$, the mild solution is in fact a classical solution and satisfies the differential equation pointwise.

This distinction is important in the study of nonlinear equations, where local and global existence results are often first obtained for mild solutions and only later upgraded to stronger notions of solution when additional regularity is available.

== See also ==
- Retarded potential
- Propagator
- Impulse response
- Variation of parameters
