= Tack (square sail) =

The starboard tack of Prince William's forecourse. The ship is close-hauled and the sail is now controlled by the tack rather than the sheet.

The tack of a square-rigged sail is a line attached to its lower corner. This is in contrast to the more common fore-and-aft sail, whose tack is a part of the sail itself, the corner which is (possibly semi-permanently) secured to the vessel.

Most square-rig sails have their clews pulled down to the yard of the sail below, and hence the position of the foot of the sail is controlled by the braces of the sail below. These sails do not have tacks. The exception to this scheme is the course, which does not have a yard below it. On this sail, the sheets are led aft, and pull the clews back as well as down, taking the place of the braces of the non-existent sail below. This works perfectly well when the wind is aft of the beam, but as the ship heads further to windward the sheets become less and less effective for controlling the windward clew.

Rather than being a simple "bag of wind" held from behind, the sail must be pulled into a (fairly poor) approximation of an aerofoil, like a modern triangular sail, by hauling the windward leech as far forward and as tight as possible. The sheet is in totally the wrong position to do this and so at this point the tack is brought into play. It is a second line attached to the clew along with the sheet, but the inboard end may be taken to a suitable point well forward of the sail and pulled taut to tighten the leech into some kind of leading edge.

For ease of movement, a tack is usually a single line rather than having blocks. A common arrangement, however, is to have a separate shorter tackle which can be hooked on to apply greater force over the last few feet of movement. This is shown (though not in use) in the picture. The tackle which is just visible stowed behind the mooring bollard can be hooked into the strop or loop (labelled) on the tack in order to tighten the leach further if it should be required.

== Sources ==
- Knight, E. F. (1889). Sailing. The All-England Series.
