= Linear density =

Mass per unit length

- Common symbols: $\rho_l$
- SI unit: kg/m
- Dimension: $\mathsf{L}^{-1} \mathsf{M}$

The linear density, represented by λ, indicates the amount of a quantity, indicated by m, per unit length along a single dimension.

Linear mass density or simply linear density is defined in the International System of Quantities (ISQ) as the quotient of mass and length. It is also called titer in textile engineering. The SI unit of linear mass density is the kilogram per meter (kg/m).

Although (linear) density is most often used to mean (linear) mass density, the concept can be generalized for the quotient of any other quantity by length, called lineic quantities in the ISQ. For example, linear charge density or lineic electric charge is the amount of electric charge per unit length.

Linear density most often describes the characteristics of one-dimensional objects, although linear density can also be used to describe the density along one particular spatial dimension of a three-dimensional object.

== Definition ==
Consider a long, thin rod of mass $M$ and length $L$. To calculate the average linear mass density, $\bar\lambda_m$, of this one dimensional object, we can simply divide the total mass, $M$, by the total length, $L$:
$$\bar\lambda_m = \frac{M}{L}$$
If we describe the rod as having a varying mass (one that varies as a function of position along the length of the rod, $l$), we can write:
$$m = m(l)$$
Each infinitesimal unit of mass, $dm$, is equal to the product of its linear mass density, $\lambda_m$, and the infinitesimal unit of length, $dl$:
$$dm = \lambda_m dl$$
The linear mass density can then be understood as the derivative of the mass function with respect to the one dimension of the rod (the position along its length, $l$)
$$\lambda_m = \frac{dm}{dl}$$

=== Units ===
Common units of linear mass density include:

- kilogram per meter (using SI base units)
- ounce (mass) per foot
- ounce (mass) per inch
- pound (mass) per yard: used in the North American railway industry for the linear density of rails
- pound (mass) per foot
- pound (mass) per inch

=== Textile applications ===
Linear density of fibers and yarns can be measured by many methods. The simplest one is to measure a length of material and weigh it. However, this requires a large sample and masks the variability of linear density along the thread, and is difficult to apply if the fibers are crimped or otherwise cannot lay flat relaxed. If the density of the material is known, the fibers are measured individually and have a simple shape, a more accurate method is direct imaging of the fiber with a scanning electron microscope to measure the diameter and calculation of the linear density. Finally, linear density is directly measured with a vibroscope. The sample is tensioned between two hard points, mechanical vibration is induced and the fundamental frequency is measured.

Common units include:

- tex, a unit of measure for the linear density of fibers, defined as the mass in grams per 1,000 meters
- denier, a unit of measure for the linear density of fibers, defined as the mass in grams per 9,000 meters
- decitex (dtex), a unit for the linear density of fibers, defined as the mass in grams per 10,000 meters

== Generalization: lineic quantities ==
The qualifier lineic is recommended in the International System of Quantities (ISO 80000-1) to denote the quotient of any physical quantity by length. The expressions "per unit length" or "linear ... density" (or simply "density") are also often used, with resulting units involving reciprocal metre (m^{−1}), for example:

- linear mass density or lineic mass
- linear charge density or lineic electric charge, electric charge per unit length
- linear number density or lineic number, number of entities per unit length
- propagation constant (attenuation constant and phase constant)

=== Linear charge density ===
Consider a long, thin wire of charge $Q$ and length $L$. To calculate the average linear charge density, $\bar\lambda_q$, of this one dimensional object, we can simply divide the total charge, $Q$, by the total length, $L$:
$$\bar\lambda_q = \frac{Q}{L}$$
If we describe the wire as having a varying charge (one that varies as a function of position along the length of the wire, $l$), we can write:
$$q = q(l)$$
Each infinitesimal unit of charge, $dq$, is equal to the product of its linear charge density, $\lambda_q$, and the infinitesimal unit of length, $dl$:
$$dq = \lambda_q dl$$
The linear charge density can then be understood as the derivative of the charge function with respect to the one dimension of the wire (the position along its length, $l$)
$$\lambda_q = \frac{dq}{dl}$$

Notice that these steps were exactly the same ones we took before to find $\lambda_m = \frac{dm}{dl}$.

The SI unit of linear charge density is the coulomb per meter (C/m).

== Other applications ==
In drawing or printing, the term linear density also refers to how densely or heavily a line is drawn.

The most famous abstraction of linear density is the probability density function of a single random variable.

== See also ==
- Density
  - Area density
  - Columnar density
  - Paper density
- Linear number density
