= Throat halyard =

A line that raises the end of a gaff nearer to the mast

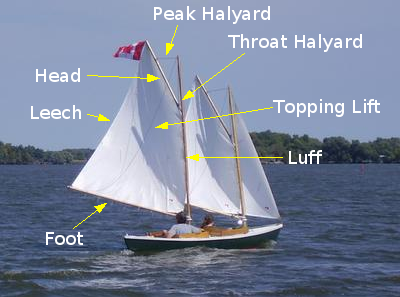
Halyards (and edges) on a gaff rigged sail

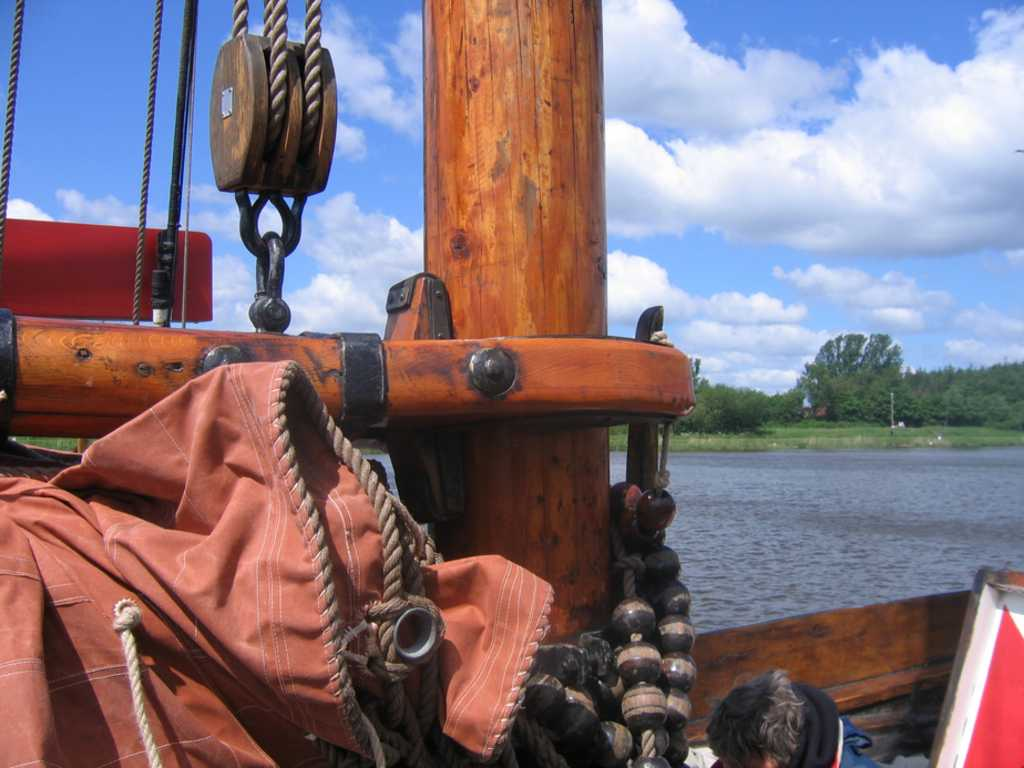
Throat of gaff rig

In sailing, the throat halyard (or throat for short) is a line that raises the end of a gaff nearer to the mast, as opposed to the peak halyard which raises the end further from the mast. Such rigging was normal in classic gaff-rigged schooners and in other ships with fore-and-aft rigging. It is absent in Bermuda rigged boats.
