= Peak halyard =

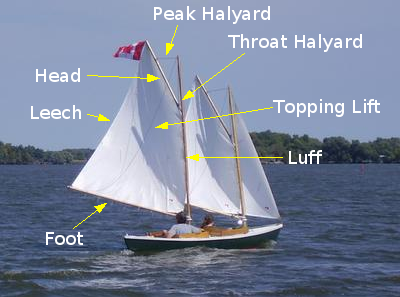
Halyards (and edges) on a gaff rigged sail

In sailing, the peak halyard (or peak for short) is a line that raises the end of a gaff, which is further from the mast, as opposed to the throat halyard that raises the end, which is nearer to the mast. Such rigging was normal in classic gaff-rigged schooners and in other ships with fore-and-aft rigging. It is absent in Bermuda rig boats.

The peak halyard is either bent to the gaff itself or to a wire gunter depending upon the mode of rigging.
