= Glossary of nautical terms (A–L) =

This glossary of nautical terms is an alphabetical listing of terms and expressions connected with ships, shipping, seamanship and navigation on water (mostly though not necessarily on the sea). Some remain current, while many date from the 17th to 19th centuries. The word nautical derives from the Latin nauticus, from Greek nautikos, from nautēs: "sailor", from naus: "ship".

Further information on nautical terminology may also be found at Nautical metaphors in English, and additional military terms are listed in the Multiservice tactical brevity code article. Terms used in other fields associated with bodies of water can be found at Glossary of fishery terms, Glossary of underwater diving terminology, Glossary of rowing terms, and Glossary of meteorology.

Contents: Top	A	B	C	D	E	F	G	H	I	J	K	L	M	N	O	P	Q	R	S	T	U	V	W	X	Y	Z	See also	References

== A ==
AAW
An acronym for anti-aircraft warfare.
aback
(of a sail) Filled by the wind on the opposite side to the one normally used to move the vessel forward. On a square-rigged ship, any of the square sails can be braced round to be aback, the purpose of which may be to reduce speed (such as when a ship-of-the-line is keeping station with others), to heave to, or to assist moving the ship's head through the eye of the wind when tacking. A sudden shift in the wind can also cause a square-rigged vessel to be unintentionally "caught aback" with all sails aback. This is a dangerous situation that risks serious damage. In a fore-and-aft-rigged vessel, a headsail is backed either by hauling it across with the weather sheet or by tacking without releasing the sheet. It is used to heave to or to assist with tacking. See also back and fill.
abaft
Toward the stern, relative to some object (e.g. "abaft the cockpit").
abaft the beam
Farther aft than the beam; a relative bearing of greater than 90 degrees from the bow; e.g. "two points abaft the beam, starboard side" would describe "an object lying 22.5 degrees toward the rear of the ship, as measured clockwise from a perpendicular line from the right side, center, of the ship, toward the horizon".
abandon ship
An imperative to leave the vessel immediately, usually in the face of some imminent overwhelming danger. It is an order issued by the master or a delegated person in command, and must be a verbal order. It is usually the last resort after all other mitigating actions have failed or become impossible, when destruction or loss of the ship is imminent, and is customarily followed by a command to "man the lifeboats" or life rafts.
abeam
On the beam; a relative bearing at right angles to the ship's keel; e.g. describing an object located at a bearing of 90 degrees (starboard) or 270 degrees (port) as measured clockwise from the ship's bow.
able seaman (AB)

A merchant seaman qualified to perform all routine duties on a vessel, or a junior rank in some navies.
aboard
On or in a vessel. Synonymous with "on board". See also close aboard.
about
To change the course of a ship by tacking. "Ready about" is the order to prepare for tacking.
above board
On or above the deck; in plain view; not hiding anything. Pirates would often hide their crews below decks, thereby creating the false impression that an encounter with another ship was a casual matter of chance rather than a planned assault.
above-water hull
The section of a vessel's hull above the waterline; the visible part of a ship. See also topsides.
absentee pennant
A special pennant flown to indicate the absence of a ship's commanding officer, admiral, chief-of-staff, or an officer whose flag is nonetheless flying (a division, squadron, or flotilla commander).
absolute bearing
The bearing of an object in relation to north: either true bearing, using the geographical or true north, or magnetic bearing, using magnetic north. See also bearing and relative bearing.
accommodation ladder
A portable flight of steps down a ship's side.
accommodation ship

A ship or hull used as housing, generally when there is a lack of quarters available ashore. An operational ship can be used, but more commonly a hull modified for accommodation is used.
Act of Grace
Act of Pardon
A letter from a state or power authorising action by a privateer. See also letter of marque.
action stations

admiral
A senior naval officer of flag rank. In ascending order of seniority in the Royal Navy: rear admiral, vice admiral, admiral, (until about 2001, when all British five-star ranks were discontinued) admiral of the fleet, and the Lord High Admiral. In the US Navy: rear admiral (lower half), rear admiral, vice admiral, admiral, and (unused since the Second World War) fleet admiral.
admiralty
1. A high naval authority in charge of a state's navy or a major territorial component. In the Royal Navy (UK), the Board of Admiralty, executing the office of the Lord High Admiral, promulgates naval law in the form of King's Regulations and admiralty instructions.
2. Another name for admiralty law.
admiralty law
The body of law that deals with maritime cases. In the UK, it is administered by the Admiralty Court, a special court within the King's Bench Division of the High Court of Justice. The Admiralty Court is now in the Rolls Building.
adrift
1. Afloat and unattached in any way to the shore or seabed, but not underway. When referring to a vessel, it implies that the vessel is not being or able to be controlled and therefore goes where the wind and current take her; a vessel in this condition may also be described as "loose from her moorings" or "out of place".
2. Any gear not fastened down or stored properly.
3. Any person or thing that is misplaced or missing. When applied to a member of the Navy or Marine Corps, such a person is said to be "absent without leave" (AWOL) or, in US Navy and US Marine Corps terminology, is guilty of an "unauthorized absence" (UA).
advance note
A note for one month's wages issued to a sailor on his signing a ship's articles.
adviso

afloat
1. (of a vessel) Floating freely (not aground or sunk). The term may also be used more generally of any floating object or person.
2. In service, even if not currently underway, but not stranded, crewless, in repair, or under construction (e.g. "the company has 10 ships afloat").
afore
1. In, on, or toward the fore or front of a vessel.
2. In front of a vessel.
aft
Toward the stern or rear of a vessel. To the purist, this is an adverb (e.g. "he walked aft") with the corresponding adjective being after (e.g. "the after mooring cleat")
after
Towards the stern. This is an adjective, unlike aft which is an adverb.
afterbrow
On larger ships, a secondary gangway rigged in the area abaft of midship. On some military vessels, such as US naval vessels, enlisted personnel below E-7 board the ship at the afterbrow; officers and CPO/SCPO/MCPO board the ship at the brow.
aftercastle

A stern structure behind the mizzenmast and above the transom on large sailing ships, much larger but less common than a forecastle. The aftercastle houses the captain's cabin and sometimes other cabins and is topped by the poop deck.
afterdeck
The portion of the deck that is abaft of amidships.
afternoon watch
The 1200–1600 watch.
aground
Resting on or touching the ground or land, or the bottom of a body of water (either unintentionally or deliberately, such as in a drying harbour), as opposed to afloat.
ahead
Forward of the bow.
ahoo
An adjective indicating an un-seamanlike state of disarray. Used to describe something awry, askew, or even round but out of true. E.g. "What a sad lubberly display is that craft underway! They're still dragging their fenders in the surf, and their sails are all ahoo!".
ahoy
A cry to draw attention. Used to hail a boat or a ship, e.g. "boat ahoy".
ahull
1. Lying broadside to the sea.
2. To ride out a storm with no sails and helm held to leeward.
aid to navigation (ATON)

1. Any device external to a vessel or aircraft specifically intended to assist navigators in determining their position or safe course, or to warn them of dangers or obstructions to navigation.
2. Any sort of marker that aids a traveler in navigation, especially with regard to nautical or aviation travel. Such aids commonly include lighthouses, buoys, fog signals, and day beacons.
aircraft carrier

A warship designed with a primary mission of deploying and recovering aircraft while at sea, thereby acting as a seagoing airbase. Since 1918, the term generally has been limited to a warship with an extensive flight deck designed to operate conventional fixed-wing aircraft. In US Navy slang, also called a "flat top" or a "bird farm".
air draft
air draught
maximum vertical extent of any part of the vessel above the water surface. Clearance required for passing under a bridge.
aka
Structural section of a vessel that joins together the hulls of a multihulled vessel.
alee
1. On the lee side of a ship.
2. To leeward.
all hands
A ship's entire company, including both officers and enlisted personnel.
all night in
Having no night watches.
all standing
Bringing a person or thing up short; i.e. an unforeseen and sudden stop.
allision
The impact of a moving vessel with a stationary object (not submerged), such as a bridge abutment or dolphin, pier or wharf, or another vessel made fast to a pier or wharf. More than incidental contact is required. The vessel is said to "allide" with the fixed object and is considered at fault. Contrast collision.
aloft
1. In the rigging of a sailing ship.
2. Above the ship's uppermost solid structure.
3. Overhead or high above.
alongside
By the side of a ship or pier.
ama
A secondary hull or float attached to the primary hull of a vessel for stability, or the hulls of a modern catamaran.
amidships
1. A position half way along the length of a ship or boat.
2. A position half way between the port and starboard sides of a ship or boat, as in "helm amidships", when the rudder is in line with the keel.
ammunition ship
A naval auxiliary ship specifically configured to carry ammunition, usually for combatant ships and aircraft.
amphibious warfare ship
A wide variety of warships designed to land and support marines and ground forces in an amphibious assault. Amphibious warfare ships range in size and capability from large oceangoing ships, some with full-length flight decks, to small vessels designed to land personnel and equipment directly onto a beach.
anchor
1. Any object designed to prevent or slow the drift of a ship, attached to the ship by a line or chain; usually a metal, hook, or plough-like object designed to grip the solid seabed under the body of water. See also sea anchor.
2. To deploy an anchor (e.g. "she anchored offshore").
anchor ball
A round, black shape hoisted in the forepart of a vessel to show that it is anchored.
anchor bolster
A metal fabrication or casting on a vessel through which the anchor chain passes, and against which the anchor rests when fully housed. Also called bolster plate.
anchor buoy
A small buoy secured to a line attached to the crown of an anchor. The line allows the anchor to be unhooked from an obstruction, such as a rock or another vessel's anchor cable, so preventing raising the anchor in the normal way.
anchor chain

A chain connecting a ship to an anchor.
anchor detail
A group of men who handle ground tackle when the ship is anchoring or getting under way.
anchor home
When the anchor is secured aboard the ship for sea; i.e. when it is not deployed. Typically rests just outside the hawsepipe on the outer side of the hull, at the bow of a vessel.
anchor light
A white light displayed by a ship to indicate that it is at anchor. Two such lights are displayed by a ship over 150 feet (46 m) in length.
anchor rode

The anchor line, rope, or cable connecting the anchor chain to the vessel.
anchor scope

The ratio of the length of anchor rode to the water depth.
anchor sentinel

A separate weight on a separate line that is loosely attached to the anchor rode so that it can slide down it easily. It is made fast at a distance slightly longer than the draft of the boat. It is used to prevent the anchor rode from becoming fouled on the keel or other underwater structures when the boat is resting at anchor and moving randomly during slack tide.
anchor watch
The crewmen assigned to take care of a ship while it is anchored or moored, and charged with such duties as making sure that the anchor is holding and the vessel is not drifting. Most marine GPS units have an anchor watch alarm capability.
anchor winch
A horizontal capstan in the bow used for weighing anchor.
anchorage
Any place suitable for a ship to anchor, often an area of a port or harbor.
anchor's aweigh
Said of an anchor to indicate that it is just clear of the bottom and that the ship is therefore no longer anchored.
Andrew
Traditional lower-deck slang term for the Royal Navy.
anemometer
An instrument used to measure wind speed.
aneroid barometer
An instrument used to measure air pressure, often with the aim of predicting changes in weather.
angle of attack
The angle between the apparent wind and the chord line of the sail.
angle on the bow
A naval submariner's term for the angle between a target's course and the line of sight to the submarine. It is expressed as port or starboard, so never exceeds 180 degrees. This is one of the figures entered into the Torpedo Data Computer that makes all the calculations necessary for a torpedo attack on the target. Not to be confused with doubling the angle on the bow.
answer
The expected response of a vessel to control mechanisms, such as a turn "answering" to the wheel and rudder. "She won't answer" might be the report from a helmsman when turning the wheel under a pilot's order fails to produce the expected change of direction.
anti-rolling tanks
A pair of fluid-filled tanks mounted on opposite sides of a ship below the waterline. The tanks are cross-linked by piping or ducts to allow water to flow between them and at the top by vents or air pipes. The piping is sized so that as the fluid flows from side to side it damps the amount of roll.
anti-submarine net

A heavy underwater net attached to a boom and placed so as to protect a harbor, anchorage, or strait from penetration by submerged submarines.
apeak
More or less vertical. Having the anchor rode or chain as nearly vertical as possible without freeing the anchor.
aport
Toward the port side of a vessel.
apron
A piece of wood fitted to the after side of the stem post and the fore side of the sternpost of a clinker-built boat, where the planking is secured.
apparent wind
The combination of the true wind and the headwind caused by the boat's forward motion. For example, it causes a light side wind to appear to come from well ahead of the beam.
arc of visibility
The portion of the horizon over which a lighted aid to navigation is visible from seaward.
archboard
A plank along the stern where the name of a ship is commonly painted.
armada
A large fleet of warships.
armament
A ship's complement of weapons.
armor belt
See belt armor.
armory
Area on a warship for storage of small arms and ammunition.
Articles of War
Regulations governing the military and naval forces of the UK and US; read to every ship's company on commissioning and at specified intervals during the commission.
as the crow flies
As measured by a straight line between two points (which might cross land), in the way that a crow or other bird would be capable of traveling rather than a ship, which must go around land. See also great circle.
ASDIC
Purportedly an acronym for Allied Submarine Devices Investigation Committee, and a type of SONAR used by the Allies for detecting submarines during the First and Second World Wars. The term has been generically applied to equipment for "under-water supersonic echo-ranging equipment" of submarines and other vessels.
ashore
1. On the beach, shore, or land (as opposed to aboard or on board a vessel).
2. Towards the shore.
3. To "run ashore": to collide with the shore (as opposed to "run aground", which is to strike a submerged feature such as a reef or sandbar).
assembly station
See muster station.
astarboard
Toward the starboard side of a vessel.
astern
1. Toward the stern or rear of a vessel.
2. Behind a vessel.
astern gear
The gear or gears that, when engaged with an engine or motor, result in backwards movement or force. Equivalent to reverse in a manual-transmission automobile.
asylum harbour
A harbour used to provide shelter from a storm. See harbor of refuge.
ASW
An acronym for anti-submarine warfare.
Atlantic bow
A raised bow with noticeable sheer and flare introduced in German warships in the late 1930s to improve seakeeping by keeping the forecastle drier and to allow easier operation of weapons.
athwart
athwartships
At right angles to the fore and aft or centerline of a ship.
auxiliary
1. An engine installed on a sailing vessel to provide mechanical power when entering harbour or in light or contrary winds.
2. A vessel in naval service but crewed mostly or entirely by civilians (as in Royal Fleet Auxiliary Service and Royal Naval Auxiliary Service)
auxiliary ship

A naval ship designed to operate in any number of roles supporting combatant ships and other naval operations, including a wide range of activities related to replenishment, transport, repair, harbor services and research.
avast
Stop, cease or desist from whatever is being done. From the Dutch: hou' vast, lit. 'hold on'; the imperative form of Dutch: vasthouden, lit. 'to hold on to', or the Italian: basta. Compare ¡Ya basta!
aviso

A kind of dispatch boat or advice boat, surviving particularly in the French Navy. They are considered equivalent to modern sloops.
awash
So low in the water that the water is constantly washing across the surface.
aweigh
The position of an anchor that is just clear of making contact with the bottom.
axial fire
Fire oriented towards the ends of the ship; the opposite of broadside fire. In the Age of Sail, this was known as "raking fire".
aye, aye
(/ˌaɪ ˈaɪ/) A reply to an order or command to indicate that it, firstly, is heard; and, secondly, is understood and will be carried out (e.g. "Aye, aye, sir" to officers). Also the proper reply from a hailed boat, to indicate that an officer is on board.
azimuth circle
An instrument used to take the bearings of celestial objects.
azimuth compass
An instrument employed for ascertaining the position of the Sun with respect to magnetic north. The azimuth of an object is its bearing from the observer measured as an angle clockwise from true north.
azimuth thruster
A steerable drive leg fitted through the bottom of a hull, carrying a propeller. Compare stern drive and sail drive.

Contents: Top	A	B	C	D	E	F	G	H	I	J	K	L	M	N	O	P	Q	R	S	T	U	V	W	X	Y	Z	See also	References

== B ==
B & R rig
A style of standing rigging used on sailboats that lacks a backstay. The mast is said to be supported like a "tripod", with swept-back spreaders and a forestay. Used widely on Hunter brand sailboats, among others. Designed and named by Lars Bergstrom and Sven Ridder.
back
1. To make a sail fill with wind on the opposite side normally used for sailing forward. A fore and aft headsail is backed by either not moving the sail across when tacking, or by hauling it to windward with the weather sheet. A square sail is backed by hauling the yards round with the braces. The sail is then aback.
2. (With oars) to push against the water with the oar in the opposite direction than normally used for moving the boat forward. This is used to slow the speed of the boat, or to move astern when manoeuvring.
3. With regard to the wind, a counterclockwise shift relative to the vessel's current course. When this shift is clockwise, it is referred to as veer.
back and fill
A method of keeping a square-rigged vessel under control while drifting with the tide along a narrow channel. The ship lies broadside to the current, with the main topsail backed and the fore and mizzen topsail full: essentially a hove-to position. Selective backing and filling of these sails moves the ship ahead or astern, so allowing it to be kept in the best part of the channel. A jib and the spanker are used to help balance the sail plan. This method cannot be used if the wind is going in the same direction and at the same speed as the tide.
backstay
A stay or cable, reaching from the mast heads, of the topmast, the topgallant-mast the royal-mast, the skysail-mast to the ship's side abaft the lower rigging; used to support the mast.
back wash
Water forced astern by the action of the propeller. Also, the receding of waves.
baggywrinkle
A soft covering for standing rigging (such as shrouds and stays) that reduces sail chafing.
bailer
Any device for removing water that has entered a vessel.
bail out
Tacking away from other boats to obtain clear air. Often used for starting situations.
baldie
A type of Scottish sailboat introduced in 1860, used for fishing. A baldie is carvel-built, with her mast far forward and rigged with a lug sail and sometimes a jib. Some historians believe "Baldie" is a contraction of "Garibaldi", a reference to the Italian general and nationalist Giuseppe Garibaldi, whose name was a household word at the time the baldie was introduced.
balance rudder
Not usually a single rudder, but a set of three or four rudders operating together to maneuver a sternwheel steamboat. Placed just forward of the paddlewheels, the effectiveness of the balance rudder is increased by the flow of water generated by the paddles, giving such steamboats a high degree of maneuverability.
balanced rudder
A rudder with a significant amount of area ahead of the rorational axis, which moves the hydrodynamic centre of the rudder nearer to the rotation axis and reduces the torque required to steer.
ballast
Heavy material that is placed in a position low in the hull to provide stability. It can be moveable material, such as gravel or stones, permanently or semi-permanently installed, or integral to the hull, such as the (typically) lead or cast-iron ballast keel of a sailing yacht. See also in ballast.
ballast tank
A compartment which can be filled or partly filled with water, used on ships, submarines and other submersibles to control buoyancy and stability.
Baltimore Clipper
A fast sailing ship – an early form of clipper – built on the Mid-Atlantic seaboard of the United States, especially at Baltimore, Maryland. Popular as merchant ships in both the United States and the United Kingdom by the late 18th century, Baltimore Clippers usually were two-masted schooners or brigantines.
balls to four watch
US Navy slang for the 0000–0400 watch.
bank
A large area of elevated sea floor, deep enough to allow navigation.
banyan
A traditional Royal Navy term for a day or less of rest and relaxation.
bar
Mass of sand or earth raised above the general seabed depth by the motion of water. Bars are often found at the mouth of rivers or entrances to harbours and can make navigation over them extremely dangerous at some states of tide and current flow, but can also confer tranquility in the inshore waters by acting as a barrier to large waves. See also touch and go and grounding.
bar pilot
A navigator who guides a ship over dangerous sandbars at the mouths of rivers and bays.
barber hauler
A technique of temporarily rigging a sailboat lazy sheet so as to allow the boat to sail closer to the wind; i.e. using the lazy jib sheet to pull the jib closer to the mid line, allowing a point of sail that would otherwise not be achievable.
barbette
1. A fixed armored enclosure protecting a ship's guns aboard warships without gun turrets, generally taking the form of a ring of armor over which guns mounted on an open-topped rotating turntable could fire, particularly on ships built during the second half of the 19th century.
2. The inside fixed trunk of a warship's turreted gun-mounting, on which the turret revolves, containing the hoists for shells and cordite from the shell-room and magazine, particularly on ships built after the late 19th century.
barca-longa
A two- or three-masted lugger used for fishing on the coasts of Spain and Portugal and more widely in the Mediterranean Sea in the late 17th and 18th centuries. The British Royal Navy also used them for shore raids and as dispatch boats in the Mediterranean.
bareboat charter
An arrangement for the chartering or hiring of a vessel, whereby the vessel's owner provides no crew or provisions as part of the agreement; instead, the people who rent the vessel are responsible for crewing and provisioning her.
bare poles
Sailing without any canvas raised, usually in a strong wind.
barge
1. A towed or self-propelled flat-bottomed boat, built mainly for river, canal or coastal transport of heavy goods.
2. Admiral's barge: A boat (or aircraft) at the disposal of an admiral (or other high ranking flag officer) for his or her use as transportation between a larger vessel and the shore or within a harbor. In Royal Navy service, the colour of the hull (or aircraft cheat-line) denotes the rank, green for commanders-in-chief and dark blue for other flag officers.
barge slip
A specialized docking facility designed to receive a barge or car float that is used to carry wheeled vehicles across a body of water.
bark
An alternate spelling of barque.
barkentine
An alternate spelling of barquentine.
barque

A sailing vessel of three or more masts, with all masts square-rigged except the sternmost, which is fore-and-aft-rigged.
barquentine

A sailing vessel with three or more masts, with all masts fore-and-aft-rigged except the foremast, which is square-rigged.
barrack ship
A ship or craft designed to function as a floating barracks for housing military personnel.
barratry
In admiralty law, an act of gross misconduct against a shipowner or a ship's demise charterer by a ship's master or crew that damages the ship or its cargo. Acts of barratry can include desertion, illegal scuttling, theft of the ship or cargo and committing any actions that may not be in the shipowner's or demise charterer's best interests.
barometer
An instrument for measuring air pressure. Used in weather forecasting.
barrelman
A sailor stationed in the crow's nest.
batten
1. A stiff strip used to support the roach of a sail, increasing the sail area.
2. Any thin strip of material (wood, plastic, etc.).
batten down the hatches
To prepare for inclement weather by securing the closed cargo hatch covers with wooden battens so as to prevent water from entering from any angle.
battle stations

1. An announcement made aboard a naval warship to signal the crew to prepare for battle, imminent damage, or any other emergency (such as a fire).
2. Specific positions in a naval warship to which one or more crew members are assigned when battle stations is called.
battlecruiser
A type of large capital ship of the first half of the 20th century, similar in size, appearance, and cost to a battleship and typically armed with the same kind of heavy guns, but much more lightly armored (on the scale of a cruiser) and therefore faster than a battleship but more vulnerable to damage.
battleship
A type of large, heavily armored warship of the second half of the 19th century and first half of the 20th century, armed with heavy-caliber guns and designed to fight other battleships in a line of battle. It was the successor to the ship-of-the-line used during the Age of Sail.
beach

A term used broadly to refer to land or the shore, and not necessarily literally to a beach. For example, a ship which turns toward the shore can be said to have turned toward the beach, and a person or object on land can be said to be on the beach. See also on the beach.
beaching
Deliberately running a vessel aground so as to load or unload it (as with landing craft), or sometimes to prevent a damaged vessel from sinking or to facilitate repairs below the waterline.
beacon
A lighted or unlighted fixed aid to navigation attached directly to the Earth's surface. Examples include lighthouses and daybeacons.
beakhead
1. The ram on the prow of a fighting galley of ancient and medieval times.
2. The protruding part of the foremost section of a sailing ship of the 16th to the 18th centuries, usually ornate, which was used as a working platform by sailors handling the sails of the bowsprit. It also housed the crew's heads (toilets).
beam
The width of a vessel at its widest point, or a point alongside the ship at the midpoint of its length.
beam ends
The sides of a ship. To describe a ship as "on her beam ends" may mean the vessel is literally on her side and possibly about to capsize; more often, the phrase means the vessel is listing 45 degrees or more.
beam reach
Sailing with the wind coming across the vessel's beam. This is normally the fastest point of sail for a fore-and-aft-rigged vessel.
beam sea
A sea in which waves are moving perpendicular to a vessel's course.
beam wind
A wind blowing perpendicular to a vessel's course.
bear
A large, squared-off stone used with sand for scraping wooden decks clean.
bear down

To turn or steer a vessel away from the wind, often with reference to a transit.
bear up
To turn or steer a vessel into the wind.
bearing
The horizontal direction of a line of sight between two objects on the surface of the Earth. See also absolute bearing and relative bearing.
beat to quarters
Prepare for battle (in reference to beating a drum to signal the need for battle preparation).
beat to
beting
Sailing as close as possible towards the wind (perhaps only about 60°) in a zig-zag course so as to attain an upwind direction into which it is otherwise impossible to sail directly. See also tacking.
Beaufort scale
A scale describing wind speed, devised by Admiral Sir Francis Beaufort in 1808, in which winds are graded by the effects of their force on the surface of the sea or on a vessel (originally, the amount of sail that a fully rigged frigate could carry).
becalm
To cut off the wind from a sailing vessel, either by the proximity of land or by another vessel.
becalmed
Unable to move due to a lack of wind, said of a sailing vessel; resigned merely to drift with the current rather to move by controlled management of sails.
becket
A short piece of line usually spliced into a circle or with an eye on either end.
before the mast
Literally, the area of a ship before the foremast (the forecastle). Most often used to refer to men whose living quarters are located here: officers were typically quartered in the sternmost areas of the ship (near the quarterdeck), while officer-trainees lived between the two ends of the ship and become known as "midshipmen". Crew members who started out as seamen and then became midshipmen, and later, officers, were said to have gone from "one end of the ship to the other". See also hawsepiper.
belay
1. To make fast a line around a fitting, usually a cleat or belaying pin.
2. To secure a climbing person in a similar manner.
3. An order to halt a current activity or countermand an order prior to execution.
belaying pin
A short movable bar of iron or hard wood to which running rigging may be secured, or "belayed". Belaying pins are inserted in holes in a pin-rail.
bell
See ship's bell.
bell rope
A short length of line made fast to the clapper of the ship's bell.
bell buoy
A type of buoy with a large bell and hanging hammers that sound by wave action.
below
On or into a lower deck.
below decks
In or into any of the spaces below the main deck of a vessel.
belt armor

A layer of heavy metal armor plated onto or within the outer hull of a warship, typically on battleships, battlecruisers, cruisers and aircraft carriers, usually covering the warship from her main deck down to some distance below the waterline. If built within the hull, rather than forming the outer hull, the belt would be installed at an inclined angle to improve the warship's protection from shells striking the hull.
bend
1. A knot used to join two ropes or lines. See also hitch.
2. To attach a rope to an object.
3. To fasten a sail to a yard or stay so that it may be set.
Bermuda rig
Bermudan rig
A triangular mainsail, without any upper spar, which is hoisted up the mast by a single halyard attached to the head of the sail. This configuration, introduced to Europe about 1920, allows the use of a tall mast, enabling sails to be set higher where wind speed is greater.
Bermuda sloop
A fore-and-aft-rigged sailing vessel with a single mast setting a Bermuda rig mainsail and a single headsail. The Bermuda sloop is a very common type of modern sailing yacht.
berth
1. A location in a port or harbor used specifically for mooring vessels while not at sea.
2. A safe margin of distance to be kept by a vessel from another vessel or from an obstruction, hence the phrase "to give a wide berth".
3. A bed or sleeping accommodation on a boat or ship.
4. A job or position of employment on a boat or ship.
best bower
The larger of two anchors carried in the bow; so named as it was the last, "best" hope for anchoring a vessel.
between the devil and the deep blue sea
See devil seam.
between wind and water
The part of a ship's hull that is sometimes submerged and sometimes brought above water by the rolling of the vessel.
bight
1. A loop in a rope or line – a hitch or knot tied "on the bight" is one tied in the middle of a rope, without access to the ends.
2. An indentation in a coastline.
bilander

A small European merchant sailing ship with two masts, the mainmast lateen-rigged with a trapezoidal mainsail, and the foremast carrying the conventional square course and square topsail. Used in the Netherlands for coast and canal traffic and occasionally in the North Sea, but more frequently used in the Mediterranean Sea.
bilge
1. The part of the hull that the ship rests on if it takes the ground; the outer end of the floors. The "turn of the bilge" is the part of the hull that changes from the (approximately) vertical sides of the hull to the more horizontal bottom of the ship.
2. (Usually in the plural: "bilges") The compartment at the bottom of the hull of a ship or boat where water collects and must be pumped out of the vessel; the space between the bottom hull planking and the ceiling of the hold.
3. To damage the hull in the area of the bilge, usually by grounding or hitting an obstruction.
4. To fail an academic course ("bilge") or curriculum ("bilge out").
bilge keel
One of a pair of keels on either side of the hull, usually slanted outwards. In yachts, they allow the use of a drying mooring, the boat standing upright on the keels (and often a skeg) when the tide is out.
bilged on her anchor
A ship that has run upon her own anchor such that the anchor cable runs under the hull.
bill
The extremity of the arm of an anchor; the point of or beyond the fluke.
billethead
1. On smaller vessels, a non-figural carving, most often a curl of foliage, as a substitute for a figurehead.
2. A round piece of timber at the bow or stern of a whaleboat, around which the harpoon line is run out when the whale darts off.
Bimini top
An open-front canvas top for the cockpit of a boat, usually supported by a metal frame.
bimmy
A punitive instrument.
binnacle
The stand on which the ship's compass is mounted, usually near the helm, permitting ready reference by the helmsman.
binnacle list
A ship's sick list. The list of men unable to report for duty was given to the officer or mate of the watch by the ship's surgeon. The list was kept at the binnacle.
bird farm
United States Navy slang for an aircraft carrier.
bite
Verb used in reference to a rudder, as in "the rudder begins to bite". When a vessel has steerageway the rudder will act to steer the vessel, i.e. it has enough water flow past it to steer with. Physically this is noticeable with tiller or unassisted wheel steering by the rudder exhibiting resistance to being turned from the straight ahead – this resistance is the rudder "biting" and is how a helmsman first senses that a vessel has acquired steerageway.
bitt
1. A post or pair of posts mounted on the ship's bow for fastening ropes or cables.
2. A strong vertical timber or iron fastened through the deck beams that is used for securing ropes or hawsers.
bitt heads
The tops of two massive timbers that support the windlass on a sailing barge.
bitter end
The last part or loose end of a rope or cable. The anchor cable is tied to the bitts; when the cable is fully paid out, the bitter end has been reached.
black gang
The engineering crew of the vessel, i.e. crew members who work in the vessel's engine room, fire room and/or boiler room, so called because they would typically be covered in coal dust during the days of coal-fired steamships.
blinker
A search light, used for signaling by code. Usually fitted with a spring controlled shutter.
block
A pulley with one or more sheaves or grooves over which a line is roved. It can be used to change the direction of the line, or in pairs used to form a tackle.
block, fiddle
A block with two sheaves in the same plane, one being smaller than the other, giving the block a somewhat violin appearance.
block, snatch
A single sheave block with one end of the frame hinged and able to be opened, so as to admit a line other than by forcing an end through the opening.
blockship
A vessel sunk deliberately to block a waterway to prevent the waterway's use by an enemy.
blower

A mechanically driven fan used to increase air supply to the boiler furnace of a steamboat or steamship, thus increasing combustion and steam pressure, and thereby engine power and speed.
Blue Ensign
A flag flown as an ensign by certain British ships. Prior to 1864, ships of the Royal Navy's Blue Squadron flew it; since the reorganisation of the Royal Navy in 1864 eliminated its naval use, it has been flown instead by British merchant vessels whose officers and crew include a certain prescribed number (which has varied over the years) of retired Royal Navy or Royal Naval Reserve personnel or are commanded by an officer of the Royal Naval Reserve in possession of a government warrant; Royal Research Ships by warrant, regardless of their manning by naval, naval reserve and Merchant Navy personnel; or British-registered yachts belonging to members of certain yacht clubs, although yachts were prohibited from flying the Blue Ensign during World War I and World War II.
Blue Peter
A blue and white flag (the flag for the letter P) hoisted at the foretrucks of ships about to sail. Formerly a white ship on a blue ground, but later a white square on a blue ground.
blue water
1. That part of the ocean lying more than a few hundred nautical miles from shore, and thus beyond the outer boundary of green water.
2. More generally, the open ocean or deep sea.
blue-water navy
1. A navy capable of sustained operations in the open ocean, beyond a few hundred nautical miles from shore.
2. That portion of a navy capable of sustained operations in the open ocean, beyond a few hundred nautical miles from shore.
bluejacket

1. A sailor or enlisted person of the Royal Navy, Commonwealth navies, the United States Navy, or the United States Coast Guard. Bluejacket derives from a blue jacket naval enlisted personnel once wore while ashore. In the Royal Navy and Commonwealth navies, the term generally is synonymous with rating and often includes petty officers and chief petty officers. In the US Navy and US Coast Guard, the term excludes chief petty officers.
2. More loosely, a sailor or enlisted person of any navy.
Bluejacket's Manual
A basic handbook for US Navy personnel.
board
1. To step onto, climb onto or otherwise enter a vessel.
2. The side of a vessel.
3. The distance a sailing vessel runs between tacks when working to windward.
boat
1. Any small craft or vessel designed to float on and provide transport over or under water.
2. Naval slang for a submarine of any size.
3. A term used in Canada and the United States for a ship of any size used on the Great Lakes.
boat hook
A pole with a blunt tip and a hook on the end, sometimes with a ring on its opposite end to which a line may be attached. Typically used to assist in docking and undocking a boat, with its hook used to pull a boat towards a dock and the blunt end to push it away from a dock, as well as to reach into the water to help people catch buoys or other floating objects or to reach people in the water.
boat keeper
A boatkeeper was a sailor that knew the harbor thoroughly and was able to act as a pilot. He was in command after the last pilot had left to board a ship and brought the pilot boat back to harbor. He was required to know how to use a sextant as he could be 300 miles from port.
boathouse
A building especially designed for the storage of boats, typically located on open water such as a lake or river. Boathouses are normally used to store smaller sports or leisure craft, often rowing boats but sometimes craft such as punts or small motor boats.
boatsteerer
A member of the crew of a 19th-century whaling ship responsible for pulling the forward oar of a whaleboat and for harpooning whales.
boatswain

A non-commissioned officer responsible for the sails, ropes, rigging and boats on a ship who issues "piped" commands to seamen.
boatswain's call

A high-pitched pipe or a non-diaphragm-type whistle used on naval ships by a boatswain, historically to pass commands to the crew but in modern times limited to ceremonial use.
boatswain's chair

1. A short board or swatch of heavy canvas, secured in a bridle of ropes, used to hoist a man aloft or over the ship's side for painting and similar work. Modern boatswain's chairs incorporate safety harnesses to prevent the occupant from falling.
2. A metal chair used for ship-to-ship personnel transfers at sea while underway.
boatswain's pipe
boatswain's whistle

boatwright
A maker of boats, especially of traditional wooden construction.
bob
bobfly
A pennant or flag bearing the owner's colors and mounted on the topsail trunk.
bobstay
A stay that holds the bowsprit downwards, counteracting the effect of the forestay and the lift of sails. Usually made of wire or chain to eliminate stretching.
body plan
In shipbuilding, an end elevation showing the contour of the sides of a ship at certain points of her length.
boiler
A power generation system component that produces steam.
boilerman

boiler room

boiler uptake
The exhaust of a boiler, excluding the funnel.
bolt rope
A rope, sewn on to reinforce the edges of a sail.
bollard
From "bol" or "bole", the round trunk of a tree. A substantial vertical pillar to which lines may be made fast. Generally on the quayside rather than the ship.
bomb vessel

A type of specialized naval wooden sailing vessel of the late 17th through mid-19th centuries designed for bombarding fixed positions on land, armed for this purpose with mortars mounted forward near the bow.
bombard

1. A small, two-masted vessel common in the Mediterranean in the 18th and 19th centuries, similar in design to an English ketch.
2. An alternative name used in the 18th and 19th centuries for a bomb vessel.
Bombay runner
A large cockroach.
bonded jacky
A type of tobacco or sweet cake.
bone in her teeth
A phrase describing the appearance of a vessel throwing up a prominent bow wave while travelling at high speed. From a vantage point in front of the vessel, the wave rising in either side of the bow evokes the image of a dog carrying a bone in its mouth, and the vessel is said to have a bone in her teeth.
bonnet
An additional strip of canvas laced to the foot of a sail to increase its area. In square-rigged vessels c. 1350–1660 the courses did not have reef points. Instead, the equivalent of a reef was the removal of the bonnet.
booby
A type of bird that has little fear and therefore is particularly easy to catch.
booby hatch
A raised framework or hood like covering over a small hatchway on a ship.
boom
1. A floating barrier to control navigation into and out of rivers and harbors.
2. A spar attached to the foot of a fore-and-aft sail.
3. A spar to extend the foot of gaffsail, trysail or jib.
3. A spar to extend the yards of square-rigged masts to allow the carrying of studding sails.
boom defence vessel
An alternative term for a net laying ship.
boomer
Slang term in the US Navy for a ballistic missile submarine.
boom crutch
A frame in which the boom rests when the sail is not hoisted.
boom gallows
A raised crossmember that supports a boom when the sail is lowered (and which obviates the need for a topping lift).
boomie

A ketch-rigged barge with gaff (instead of spritsail) and boom on main and mizzen. Booms'l rig could also refer to cutter-rigged early barges.
boom vang

A sail control that lets one apply downward tension on a boom, countering the upward tension provided by the sail. The boom vang adds an element of control to sail shape when the sheet is let out enough that it no longer pulls the boom down. Boom vang tension helps control leech twist, a primary component of sail power.
boomkin

booms
Masts or yards, lying on board in reserve.
boot-top
The area on the ship's hull along the waterline, usually painted a contrasting color.
bore
(As in, bore up or bore away) To assume a position to engage, or disengage, the enemy ships.
bosun

bosun's call

bosun's chair

bosun's pipe
bosun's whistle

bottlescrew
A device for adjusting tension in stays, shrouds and similar lines.
bottom
1. The underside of a vessel; the portion of a vessel that is always underwater.
2. A ship, most often a cargo ship.
3. A cargo hold.
bottomry
Pledging a ship as security in a financial transaction.
bow
1. The front of a vessel.
2. Either side of the front (or bow) of the vessel, i.e. the port bow and starboard bow. Something ahead and to the left of the vessel is "off the port bow", while something ahead and to the right of the vessel is "off the starboard bow". When "bow" is used in this way, the front of the vessel sometimes is called her bows (plural), a collective reference to her port and starboard bows synonymous with bow (singular).
bow chaser

bowline
1. A type of knot producing a strong loop of a fixed size, topologically similar to a sheet bend.
2. A rope attached to the side of a sail to pull it towards the bow (for keeping the windward edge of the sail steady).
3. A rope attached to the foresail to hold it aback when tacking.
4. "Sailing on a bowline" means sailing to weather close-hauled.
bowman
The person, in a team or among oarsmen, positioned nearest the bow.
bowpicker
A gillnetter that fishes by deploying a gillnet from her bow.
bowse
To pull or hoist.
bow sea
Seas approaching a vessel from between 15° and 75° to port or starboard.
bows on
Said of a vessel directly approaching an observer, e.g., "The ship approached us bows on."
bowsprit
A spar projecting from the bow that is used as an anchor for the forestay and other rigging. On a barge it may be pivoted so it may be steeved up in harbor.
bows under
Said of a vessel shipping water over her bow, e.g., "The ship was bows under during the storm."
bow thruster
A small propeller or water-jet at the bow, used for manoeuvring larger vessels at slow speed. May be mounted externally, or in a tunnel running through the bow from side to side.
bow visor
A feature of some ships, particularly ferries and roll-on/roll-off ships, that allows a vessel's bow to articulate up and down to provide access to her cargo ramp and storage deck near the waterline.
bow wave
The wave created on either side of a vessel's bow as she moves through the water.
bow windshield
A structure fitted on the bow of some containerships to decrease aerodynamic drag and improve fuel efficiency.
boxing the compass
To state all 32 points of the compass, starting at north and proceeding clockwise. Sometimes applied to a wind that is constantly shifting.
boy seaman
A young sailor, still in training.
brace
On square-rigged ships, a line attached to the end of a yard to rotate it around a vertical axis, for trimming the sail. Braces are fitted in pairs to each yard, one at each end.
brace abox
To bring the foreyards flat aback to stop the ship.
brail
1. To furl a sail by pulling it in towards the mast and/or to the yard or gaff on which it is set . Where the brailing action is mostly moving towards the mast, it is termed "brailing in". If the sail is generally moving up to a spar, that is called "brailing up".
2. A line used to haul the edges or corners of a sail up or in, either preparatory to furling or as the act of furling the sail. Some brails do not have a more specific name, especially on a fore and aft sail. In other cases, clewlines, buntlines and leechlines may be considered types of brails.
brail net
A type of net incorporating brail lines on a small fishing net on a boat.
brailer
A device consisting of a net of small-mesh webbing attached to a frame, used aboard fishing vessels for unloading large quantities of fish.
brake
The handle of the pump, by which it is worked.
brass monkey, brass monkey weather
Used in the expression "it is cold enough to freeze the balls off a brass monkey". Apocryphally, it is often claimed that a brass monkey was a frame used to hold cannon balls, and low temperature would cause the frame to contract to a greater degree than the iron balls and thus allow them to roll off. See brass monkey for the probable actual etymology.
brass pounder
Early 20th-century slang term for a vessel's radio operator, so-called because he repeatedly struck a brass key on his transmitter to broadcast in Morse code.
breachway
1. The shore along a channel.
2. The whole area around the place where a channel meets the ocean.
break bulk cargo

Goods that must be loaded aboard a ship individually and not in intermodal containers or in bulk, carried by a general cargo ship.
breaker
1. A shallow portion of a reef over which waves break.
2. A breaking wave that breaks into foam against the shore, a shoal, a rock or a reef. Sailors use breakers to warn themselves of their vessel's proximity to an underwater hazard to navigation or, at night or during periods of poor visibility, of their vessel's proximity to shore.
3. A ship breaker, often used in the plural, e.g. "The old ship went to the breakers".
4. A small cask of liquid kept permanently in a ship's boat in case of becoming separated from the ship or if used as a lifeboat.
breakwater
1. A structure constructed on a coast as part of a coastal defense system or to protect an anchorage from the effects of weather and longshore drift.
2. A structure built on the forecastle of a ship intended to divert water away from the forward superstructure or gun mounts.
breeches buoy
A ring lifebuoy fitted with canvas breeches, functionally similar to a zip line, used to transfer people from one ship to another or to rescue people from a wrecked or sinking ship by moving them to another ship or to the shore.
breast hook
A horizontal knee that joins the sides of a traditional wooden hull to the stem, reinforcing their connection.
breastrope
A mooring rope fastened anywhere on a ship's side that goes directly to the quay, so that it is roughly at right angles to both.
bridge
A structure above the weather deck, extending the full width of the vessel, which houses a command center, itself called by association the bridge.
bridge wing
A narrow walkway extending outward from both sides of a pilothouse to the full width of a ship or slightly beyond, to allow bridge personnel a full view to aid in the maneuvering of the ship, such as when docking.
brig
1. A vessel with two square-rigged masts.
2. An American term for an interior area of a ship that is used to detain prisoners (possibly prisoners-of-war, in wartime) or stowaways, and to punish delinquent crew members. Usually resembles a prison cell with bars and a locked, hinged door.
brig sloop
A type of sloop-of-war introduced in the 1770s that had two square-rigged masts like a brig (in contrast to ship sloops of the time, which had three masts).
brigantine

A two-masted vessel, square-rigged on the foremast but fore-and-aft-rigged on the mainmast.
brightwork
Exposed varnished wood on a boat or ship.
bring to
To cause a ship to be stationary by arranging the sails.
broach
1. When a sailing or power vessel loses directional control when travelling with a following sea. The vessel turns sideways to the wind and waves and in more serious cases may capsize or pitchpole. Advice on dealing with heavy weather includes various strategies for avoiding this happening.
2. An unintentional appearance above the surface of all or part of a submerged submarine, a dangerous event when the submarine is in proximity to enemy forces or near any ship which might collide with her.
broad
Wide in appearance from the vantage point of a lookout or other person viewing activity in the vicinity of a ship, e.g. another ship off the starboard bow with her side facing the viewer's ship could be described as "broad on the starboard bow" of the viewer's ship.
Broad Fourteens
An area of the southern North Sea which is fairly consistently 14 fathoms (84 feet; 26 metres) deep. On a nautical chart with depths indicated in fathoms, it appears as a broad area with many "14" notations.
broadhorn
An alternate term for a flatboat.
broadside
1. One side of a vessel above the waterline.
2. All the guns on one side of a warship or mounted (in rotating turrets or barbettes) so as to be able to fire on the same side of a warship.
3. The simultaneous firing of all the guns on one side of a warship or able to fire on the same side of a warship.
4. Weight of broadside: the combined weight of all projectiles a ship can fire in a broadside engagement, or the combined weight of all the shells which a group of ships that have formed a line of battle can collectively fire on the same side.
Brouwer Route
A route used by ships in the 17th century while sailing east from the Cape of Good Hope to the Netherlands East Indies which took advantage of the strong westerly winds in the southern Indian Ocean known as the "Roaring Forties" to speed the trip but required ships to turn north in the eastern Indian Ocean to reach the East Indies. With no accurate means of determining longitude at the time, ships which missed the northward turn ran the risk of being wrecked on the west coast of Australia.
brow

brown water
1. A collective term for rivers and coastal waters.
2. Maritime waters which lie over the continental shelf.
brown-water navy
1. A navy capable of operating on rivers and/or in coastal environments.
2. That portion of a navy designed and intended to operate on rivers and/or in coastal environments.
3. A navy whose capabilities limit it to operating on rivers and/or in coastal environments.
bucket
Alternative name for a paddle on a paddlewheel.
buffer
The chief bosun's mate (in the Royal Navy), responsible for discipline.
bug shoe
A length of hardened material placed on a skeg to protect the skeg from damage by shipworms.
bugeye
A type of sailboat developed in the Chesapeake Bay by the early 1880s for oyster dredging, superseded as the chief oystering boat in the bay by the skipjack at the end of the 19th century.
bulbous bow
A protruding bulb at the bow of a ship just below the waterline which modifies the way water flows around the hull, reducing drag and thus increasing speed, range, fuel efficiency and stability.
bulk cargo
Commodity cargo that is transported unpackaged in large quantities.
bulk carrier

A merchant ship specially designed to transport unpackaged bulk cargo in its cargo holds.
bulkhead
An upright wall within the hull of a ship, particularly a watertight, load-bearing wall.
bull ensign

The senior ensign of a US Navy command (i.e., a ship, squadron or shore activity).
bullseye
A glass window above the captain's cabin to allow viewing of the sails above deck.
bulward
bulwark

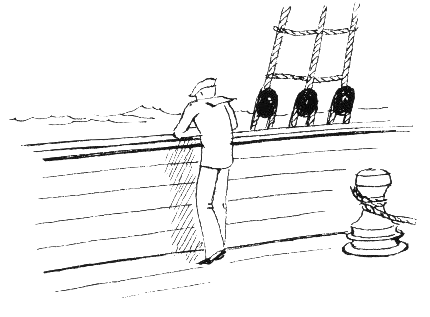
Bulwark (or bulward)

The extension of a ship's side above the level of the weather deck.
bumboat
A private boat selling goods.
bumpkin

1. A spar, similar to a bowsprit, but which projects from the stern rather than the bow. May be used to attach the backstay or mizzen sheets

2. An iron bar projecting outboard from a ship's side to which the lower and topsail brace blocks are sometimes hooked.
bunk
A built-in bed on board ship.
bunker
A container for storing coal or fuel oil for a ship's engine.
bunker fuel

Fuel oil for a ship.
bunt
1. Middle cloths of a square sail.
2. Centre of a furled square sail.
bunt-gasket
Canvas apron used to fasten the bunt of a square sail to the yard when furled.
bunting tosser
A signalman who prepares and flies flag hoists. Also known in the United States Navy as a skivvy waver.
buntline
One of the lines leading from the foot of a square sail over a block at the head and down to the deck; and used to haul it up to the yard when furling.
buoy
A floating object, usually anchored at a given position and fulfilling one of a number of uses, recognised by a defined shape and color for each, including aids to navigation, warnings of danger such as submerged wrecks or divers, or for attaching mooring lines, lobster pots, etc.
buoyed up
Lifted by a buoy, especially a cable that has been lifted to prevent it from trailing on the bottom.
burthen
The Builder's Old Measurement, expressed in "tons bm" or "tons BOM", a volumetric measurement of cubic cargo capacity, not of weight. This is the tonnage of a ship, based on the number of tuns of wine that it could carry in its holds. One 252-gallon tun of wine takes up approximately 100 cubic feet, and weighs 2,240 lbs (1 long ton, or Imperial ton).
burgee
A small flag, typically triangular, flown from the masthead of a yacht to indicate yacht-club membership.
burgoo
A dish of ships biscuit crumbs and minced salt pork, usually a meal of last resort for officers when other food stores are exhausted.
butt
Where the butt of one plank joins with the butt of another.
by and large
By means into the wind, while large means with the wind. "By and large" is therefore used to indicate all possible situations, e.g. "the ship handles well both by and large".
by the board
Anything that has gone overboard.

Contents: Top	A	B	C	D	E	F	G	H	I	J	K	L	M	N	O	P	Q	R	S	T	U	V	W	X	Y	Z	See also	References

== C ==
cabin
An enclosed structure with at least one room on a deck or flat, especially one used as living quarters.
cabin boy
An attendant to passengers and crew, often a young man.
cabin cruiser
A type of powered pleasure craft that provides accommodation for its crew and passengers inside the structure of the craft. A cabin cruiser usually is 7.6 to 13.7 metres (25 to 45 ft) in length, with a powered pleasure craft larger than that considered a motor yacht.
cabin sole
A walking surface inside a vessel.
cable
1. An especially large or thick rope.
2. A cable length.
cable length

A measure of length or distance equivalent to 1/10 nautical mile (608 feet; 185 metres) in the United Kingdom and 100 fathoms (600 feet; 183 metres) in the United States; other countries use different equivalents.
caboose
A small ship's kitchen or galley on deck.
cabotage
The transport of goods or passengers between two points in the same country along coastal routes by a vessel registered in another country. Originally applied only to shipping, the term now also is applied to analogous transport via aviation, railways, or road transport.
cage mast
See lattice mast.
camels
1. Loaded vessels lashed tightly, one on each side of another vessel, and then emptied to provide additional buoyancy that reduces the draft of the ship in the middle.
2. Floating platforms brought alongside for use by yard workers or crew.
can
A type of navigational buoy, often a vertical drum, but otherwise always square in silhouette, colored red in IALA region A (Europe, Africa, Greenland, and most of Asia and Oceania) or green in IALA region B (the Americas, Japan, Korea, and the Philippines). In channel marking its use is opposite that of a nun buoy.
canal boat
A specialized watercraft designed for operation on a canal. During the Age of Sail, canal boats typically lacked sails and masts and relied on towboats and mules to move from place to place.
canal schooner

A specialized type of canal boat developed in North America in the early 19th century and used on the Great Lakes and in Lake Champlain. Unlike conventional canal boats of the era, which lacked a means of propulsion, canal schooners had a schooner rig which allowed them to sail from place to place, but could lower their masts and raise their centreboards, allowing mules to tow them through canals. The design allowed their operators to save money by reducing their reliance on towing and paying fewer towing charges.
canaller
A ship designed to transit the locks of the Welland Canal.
canister shot

A type of antipersonnel cannon load in which lead balls or other loose metallic items were enclosed in a tin or iron shell. On firing, the shell would disintegrate, releasing the smaller metal objects with a shotgun-like effect.
canoe stern
A design for the stern of a yacht such that it is pointed like a bow, rather than squared off as a transom.
canvas
A collective term for all of the sails on a vessel; the total area of all sails aboard her may be expressed as the area of her canvas.
cap
A fitting or band used to connect the head of one mast to the lower portion of the mast above.
Cape Horn fever
A feigned illness from which a malingerer is pretending to suffer.
Cape Horn roller

A type of large ocean wave commonly encountered in the stormy seas of the Southern Ocean south of South America's Cape Horn, often exceeding 60 feet (18.3 m) in height. The geography of the Southern Ocean, uninterrupted by continents, creates an endless fetch that is favorable for the propagation of such waves.
cap-stay
A backstay leading from a mast cap to the ship's side.
capital ship
One of a set of ships considered a navy's most important warships, generally possessing the heaviest firepower and armor and traditionally much larger than other naval vessels, but not formally defined. During the Age of Sail, capital ships were generally understood to be ships of the line; during the second half of the 19th century and the 20th century, they were typically battleships and battlecruisers; and since the mid-20th century, the term may also include aircraft carriers and ballistic missile submarines.
capsize
(of a vessel) To list so severely that the vessel rolls over, exposing the keel. On large vessels, this often results in the sinking of the ship. Compare turtling.
capstan
A large winch with a vertical axis used to wind in anchors or to hoist other heavy objects, and sometimes to administer flogging over. A full-sized human-powered capstan is a waist-high cylindrical machine, operated by a number of hands who each insert a horizontal capstan bar in holes in the capstan and walk in a circle.
captain
1. The person lawfully in command of a vessel. "Captain" is an informal title of respect given to the commander of a naval vessel regardless of formal rank; aboard a merchant ship, the ship's captain is called her master.
2. A naval officer with a rank between commander and commodore.
3. In the US Navy, US Coast Guard, US Public Health Service, and National Oceanic and Atmospheric Administration, a commissioned officer of a grade superior to a commander and junior to a rear admiral (lower half), equal in grade or rank to a US Army, US Marine Corps, or US Air Force, or US Space Force colonel.
Captain of the Port
1. In the United Kingdom, a Royal Navy officer, usually a captain, responsible for the day-to-day operation of a naval dockyard.
2. In the United States, a US Coast Guard officer, usually a captain, responsible for enforcement of safety, security, and marine environmental protection regulations in a commercial port.
captain's daughter
Another name for the cat o' nine tails, which in principle is only used on board on the captain's (or a court martial's) personal orders.
car carrier
A cargo ship specially designed or fitted to carry large numbers of automobiles. Modern pure car carriers have a fully enclosed, box-like superstructure that extends along the entire length and across the entire breadth of the ship, enclosing the automobiles. The similar pure car/truck carrier can also accommodate trucks.
car float

An unpowered barge with railroad tracks mounted on its deck, used to move railroad cars across water obstacles.
caravel

A small, highly maneuverable sailing ship with a lateen rig, used by the Portuguese in the 15th and 16th centuries to explore along the West African coast and into the Atlantic Ocean.
cardinal
Referring to the four main points of the compass: north, south, east, and west. See also bearing.
careening

Tilting a ship on its side, usually when beached, to clean or repair the hull below the waterline.
cargo liner

A type of merchant ship that became common just after the middle of the 19th century, configured primarily for the transportation of general cargo but also for the transportation of at least some passengers. Almost completely replaced by more specialized cargo ships during the second half of the 20th century.
cargo ship
Any ship or vessel that carries cargo, goods, and materials from one port to another, including general cargo ships (designed to carry break bulk cargo), bulk carriers, container ships, multipurpose vessels, and tankers. Tankers, however, although technically cargo ships, are routinely thought of as constituting a completely separate category.
cargoman
A cargo ship.
carpenter
1. In the Age of Sail, a warrant officer responsible for the hull, masts, spars, and boats of a vessel, and also for sounding the well to see if the vessel was making water.
2. A senior rating responsible for all of the woodwork aboard a vessel.
carpenter's walk
On a tall ship, a narrow unlit passageway or bulkhead often with a low (four-foot) ceiling that is fitted around the hull at its waterline. The carpenter's walk allowed the ship's carpenter to tour the entire waterline area of a ship to inspect it for water leaks. Because of its dark and seldom-visited nature and location far below decks, it was also sometimes used by mutinous sailors as a secluded place to plan a rebellion against the ship's officers.
carrack

A three- or four-masted oceangoing sailing ship used by Western Europeans in the Atlantic Ocean from the 15th through the early 17th centuries.
carrier
An aircraft carrier.
carronade
A short, smoothbore, cast-iron naval cannon, used from the 1770s to the 1850s as a powerful, short-range, anti-ship and anti-crew weapon.
carry away
To suddenly break a spar, rope or other part of a ship's equipment. May be caused, for example, by overloading, stress of weather, collision or battle damage.
carry on
Resume work or assigned duties.
cartel
A ship employed on humanitarian voyages, in particular to carry communications or prisoners between belligerents during wartime. A cartel flies distinctive flags, including a flag of truce, traditionally is unarmed except for a lone signaling gun, and under international law is not subject to seizure or capture during her outbound and return voyages as long as she engages in no warlike acts.
carvel-built

A comparison of the clinker and carvel styles of boat construction

A method of constructing a wooden hull in which planks are butted edge-to-edge on a robust frame, so giving a smooth hull surface; traditionally the planks are not attached to each other, only to the frame, and have only a caulking sealant between them to make them watertight. Contrast clinker-built.
casing
A light metal structure, usually incorporating a deck, built over the upper surface of a submarine's pressure hull to create a flat surface on which crew members can walk. A feature of submarines built prior to the mid-20th century, but not of more modern submarines.
cat
1. To prepare an anchor after raising it by lifting it with a tackle to the cathead, prior to securing (fishing) it alongside for sea. An anchor raised to the cathead is said to be catted.
2. The cat o' nine tails.
3. A cat-rigged boat or catboat.
cat o' nine tails

A short, multi-tailed whip or flail kept by the bosun's mate to flog sailors (and soldiers in the army) who had committed infractions while at sea. When not in use, the cat was often kept in a baize bag, a possible origin for the term "cat out of the bag". "Not enough room to swing a cat" also derives from this.
catamaran
Any vessel with two hulls. Compare trimaran.
catboat
A cat-rigged vessel with a single mast mounted close to the bow and only one sail, usually on a gaff.
catenary

The curve of a deployed anchor chain.
catharpin
A short rope or iron clamp used to brace in the shrouds toward the masts so as to give a freer sweep to the yards.
cathead
A beam extending out from the hull used to support an anchor when raised in order to secure or "fish" it.
cat's paws
Light, variable winds on calm waters producing scattered areas of small waves.
caulk
To create a watertight seal between structures. In traditional carvel construction, this involved hammering oakum (recycled rope fibres) or caulking cotton into the slightly tapered fine gaps between the hull or deck planks and, in older methods, covering with tar. The expansion of the fibres in water tightens up the hull, making it less prone to racking movement, as well as making the joint watertight.
celestial navigation
Navigation by the position of celestial objects, including the stars, Sun, and Moon, using tools aboard ship such as a sextant, chronometer, and compass, as well as published tables of the expected positions of celestial objects on specific dates. Celestial navigation was the primary method of navigation until the development of electronic global positioning systems such as LORAN and GPS.
ceiling
Planking attached to the inside of the frames or floors of a wooden hull. It serves to separate the cargo from the hull planking itself, but also has a structural role, contributing to the strength of the hull.. The ceiling has different names in different places; e.g. limber boards, spirketting, quickwork, etc. The lower part of the ceiling is, confusingly to a landsman, what you are standing on at the bottom of the hold of a wooden ship.
center of effort American English
centre of effort British English

The point of origin of net aerodynamic force upon a sail, roughly located in the geometric center of the sail, though the actual position of the center of effort will vary with sail plan, sail trim, or airfoil profile, boat trim, and point of sail.
center of lateral resistance American English
centre of lateral resistance British English
The point of origin of net hydrodynamic resistance on the submerged structure of a boat, especially a sailboat. This is the pivot point the boat turns about when unbalanced external forces are applied, similar to the center of gravity. On a perfectly balanced sailboat, the center of effort will align vertically with the center of lateral resistance. If this is not the case, the boat will be unbalanced and will exhibit either lee helm or weather helm and will be difficult to control.
centerboard American English
centreboard British English

Diagram of the position of a centerboard on a boat

A wooden board or metal plate which can be pivoted through a fore-and-aft slot along the centerline in the hull of a sailing vessel, functioning as a retractable keel to help the boat resist leeway by moving its center of lateral resistance. Very common in dinghies, but also found in some larger boats. A daggerboard serves the same purpose but slides vertically rather than pivoting.
centerline American English
centreline British English
An imaginary line down the center of a vessel lengthwise. Any structure or anything mounted or carried on a vessel that straddles this line and is equidistant from either side of the vessel is said to be "on the centerline".
chafing
Wear on a line or sail caused by constant rubbing against another surface.
chafing gear
Material applied to a line or spar to prevent or reduce chafing. See baggywrinkle and puddening.
chain locker
A space in the forward part of a ship, typically beneath the bow in front of the foremost collision bulkhead, that contains the anchor chain when the anchor is secured for sea.
chain-shot
Cannonballs linked with short lengths of chain, designed to be especially damaging to rigging and masts.
chain plates
Iron bars bolted to a ship's side to which the deadeyes or rigging screws of the lower figging and the back-stays are bolted.
chain-wale

A broad, thick plank that projects horizontally from each of a ship's sides abreast a mast (distinguished as the fore, main, or mizzen channel accordingly), serving to extend the base for the shrouds, which support the mast.
chains
Small platforms built into the sides of a ship to spread the shrouds to a more advantageous angle. Also used as a platform for manual depth sounding.
chaloupe
See chalupa.
chalupa
1. A small boat that functions as a shallop, water taxi, or gondola.
2. In Portuguese, a small boat used for cabotage, propelled by either oars or sails. Those equipped with sails have a single mast.
3. A type of whaling boat used by the Basques in the mid-16th century in what is now Newfoundland and Labrador.
change tack

To change course or heading.
channel fever
1. The impatient excitement in a ship's crew as the end of a voyage becomes imminent. Characteristics include crew members working harder to get the ship sailing faster, off-watch personnel being on deck to keep track of progress, and everyone being packed and in their shore-going clothes (ready to be paid off) the moment the vessel arrives in port.
2. (obsolete usage) A crew member avoiding duties with a feigned illness, usually after leaving port.
Charlie/Charley Noble
The metal stovepipe chimney from a cook shack on the deck of a ship or from a stove in a galley.
charrua
A large sailing ship used as a troopship
chartered ship

A term used by the British East India Company from the 17th to the 19th centuries for a merchant ship it chartered to make a single, often one-way, voyage between England (later the United Kingdom) and ports east of the Cape of Good Hope, a trade over which the company held a strict monopoly. A charter ship during its single voyage was employed in much the same way as what the company called an extra ship, though the company usually hired charter ships on special terms and for much shorter periods.
charthouse
A compartment from which the ship was navigated, especially in the Royal Navy.
chartplotter
An electronic instrument that places the position of the ship (from a GPS receiver) onto a digital nautical chart displayed on a monitor, thereby replacing all manual navigation functions. Chartplotters also display information collected from all shipboard electronic instruments and often directly control autopilots.
chase gun

A cannon pointing forward or aft, often of longer range than other guns. Those on the bow (bow chasers) were used to fire upon a ship ahead, while those on the rear (stern chasers) were used to ward off pursuing vessels. Unlike guns pointing to the side, chasers could be brought to bear in a chase without slowing down the vessel.
chasse-marée
A decked commercial sailing vessel engaged in the transportation of fresh fish directly from fishing grounds to ports in Brittany between the 18th century and around the third quarter of the 19th century. Three-masted luggers replaced the vessels originally serving in this role; the luggers then were replaced successively by dundees, brigs, and schooners.
cheeks
1. Wooden blocks at the side of a spar.
2. Flat plates of iron or wood bolted to the masthead to form angle supports for the cross-trees.
3. The sides of a block or gun-carriage.
chief engineer
The senior engineering officer (abbreviated ChEng).
chine
1. An angle in the hull.
2. A line formed where the sides of a boat meet the bottom. Soft chine is when the two sides join at a shallow angle, and hard chine is when they join at a steep angle.
chock
A hole or ring attached to the hull to guide a line via that point; an opening in a ship's bulwark, normally oval in shape, designed to allow mooring lines to be fastened to cleats or bits mounted to the ship's deck. See also Panama chock and Dutchman's chock.
chock-a-block
Rigging blocks that are so tight against one another that they cannot be further tightened.
chop
Waves, usually created by the wind, which are smaller and shorter-lived than swell.
chronometer
A timekeeping device accurate enough to be used aboard a ship to determine longitude by means of celestial navigation. The invention of the marine chronometer in the 18th century was a major technical achievement for maritime navigation.
cigarette boat
See go-fast boat.
citadel
A fortified safe room on a vessel to take shelter in the event of pirate attack. Previously, a fortified room to protect ammunition and machinery from damage.
civil Red Ensign
The British Naval Ensign or flag of the British Merchant Navy, a red flag with the Union Flag in the upper left corner. Colloquially called the "red duster".
class
1. Strictly, a group of government ships, especially naval ships, of the same or similar design.
2. Informally, a group of private or commercial ships of the same or similar design.
3. A standard of construction for merchant vessels, including standards for specific types or specialized capabilities of some types of merchant vessels (see, for example, ice class). A ship meeting the standard is in class, while one not meeting it is out of class.
class leader
Synonym for lead ship.
classification society

See ship classification society.
clean bill of health
A certificate issued by a port indicating that a ship carries no infectious diseases. Also called a pratique.
clean slate
At the helm, the watchkeeper would record details of speed, distances, headings, etc. on a slate. At the beginning of a new watch the slate would be wiped clean.
clear
1. To perform customs and immigration legalities prior to leaving port.
2. More loosely, to leave port.
cleat
A stationary device used to secure a rope aboard a vessel.
clench
A method of fixing together two pieces of wood, usually overlapping planks, by driving a nail through both planks as well as a washer-like rove. The nail is then burred or riveted over to complete the fastening.
clew
One of the lower corners of a square sail, or, on a triangular sail, the corner at the end of the boom.
clewlines
clew-lines
Lines used to truss up the clews, the lower corners of square sails. Used to reduce and stow a barge's topsail.
clinker-built

A comparison of the clinker and carvel styles of boat construction

A method of constructing hulls that involves overlapping planks and/or plates, much like Viking longships, resulting in speed and flexibility in small boat hulls. Contrast carvel-built.
clipper
1. A sailing vessel designed primarily for speed. While the square-rigged clipper ships of the middle of the 19th century are well known, others, such as Baltimore Clippers and opium clippers could be rigged differently, often as schooners, and a small number of 19th-century clippers were built as barques.
2. A tuna clipper.
close aboard
Very near (the ship).
close-hauled
(of a vessel) Beating as close to the wind direction as possible.
clove hitch
A bend used to attach a rope to a post or bollard. Also used to finish tying off the foresail.
club hauling
A maneuver by which a ship drops one of its anchors at high speed in order to turn abruptly. This was sometimes used as a means of obtaining a good firing angle on a pursuing vessel. See kedge.
Clyde puffer
A type of small, coal-fired, single-masted Scottish steamboat built between 1856 and 1939, primarily on the Forth and Clyde Canal. They operated as cargo ships on the canal and in other waters of Scotland, including the Hebrides. The name "puffer" arose because earlier vessels had a simple steam engine with no condenser, causing them to exhaust steam from their funnels in a series of "puffs."
CO
C.O.
An abbreviation for commanding officer.
coach roof
A hulk top of the cabin from the outside.
coal hulk
A hulk used to store coal.
coal trimmer

A person responsible for ensuring that a coal-fired vessel remains in "trim" (evenly balanced) as coal is consumed on a voyage.
coaling
Loading coal for use as fuel aboard a steamship. A time-consuming, laborious, and dirty process often undertaken by the entire crew, coaling was a necessity from the early days of steam in the 19th century until the early 20th century, when oil supplanted coal as the fuel of choice for steamships.
coaming
The raised edge of a hatch, cockpit, or skylight, designed to help keep out water that pools on the surface above.
coaster

A coastal trading vessel; a shallow-hulled ship used for trade between locations on the same island or continent.
coble
A type of open traditional fishing boat with a flat bottom and high bow which developed on the northeast coast of England.
cockbill
To angle a square-rigged yard away from the horizontal so that it is out of the way for loading or unloading, or so that the ship may lie alongside another ship without the yards touching.
cockpit
A seating area (not to be confused with the deck) towards the stern of a small-decked vessel that houses the rudder controls.
cofferdam
An insulating space between two watertight bulkheads or decks within a ship.
cog
A type of sailing ship, with a single mast and a single square-rigged sail first developed in the 10th century and widely used, particularly in the Baltic Sea region, in seagoing trade from the 12th through the 14th centuries. It had a distinctive hull design: the flat bottom was carvel-built and the sides were clinker-built.
coign
A wedge used to assist in the aiming of a cannon; an older form of "quoin".
collier
A bulk cargo ship designed to carry coal, especially such a ship in naval use to supply coal to coal-fired warships.
combat loading
A way of loading a vessel that gives military forces embarked aboard her immediate access to weapons, ammunition, and supplies needed when conducting an amphibious landing. In combat loading, cargo is stowed in such a way that unloading of equipment will match up with the personnel that are landing and in the order they land, so that they have immediate access to the gear they need for combat as soon as they land. Combat loading gives primary consideration to the ease and sequence with which troops, equipment, and supplies can be made ready for combat, sacrificing the more efficient use of cargo space that ship operators seek when loading a ship for the routine transportation of personnel and cargo.
comber
A long, curving wave breaking on the shore.
come about
1. To tack.
2. To change tack.
3. To manoeuvre the bow of a sailing vessel across the wind so that the wind changes from one side of the vessel to the other.
4. To position a vessel with respect to the wind after tacking.
come to
To stop a sailing vessel, especially by turning into the wind.
commanding officer
The officer in command of a warship. Also called "CO", "captain" (regardless of rank), "skipper", or "the old man".
commission
To formally place (a naval vessel) into active service, after which the vessel is said to be in commission. Sometimes used less formally to mean placing a commercial ship into service.
commissioning pennant
A pennant flown from the masthead of a warship. Also called a masthead pennant.
commodore
1. (rank) Prior to 1997, the title used in the Royal Navy for an officer of the rank of captain who was given temporary command of a squadron. At the end of the deployment of the squadron, or in the presence of an admiral, he would revert to his de facto rank of captain.
2. (rank) A military rank used in many navies that is superior to a navy captain but below a rear admiral. Often equivalent to the rank of "flotilla admiral" or sometimes "counter admiral" in non-English-speaking navies.
3. (convoy commodore) A civilian put in charge of the good order of the merchant ships in British convoys during World War II, but with no authority over naval ships escorting the convoy.
4. (commodore (yacht club)) An officer of a yacht club.
5. (Commodore (Sea Scouts)) A position in the Boy Scouts of America's Sea Scouts program.
communication tube

An air-filled tube, usually armored, allowing speech between the conning tower and the below-decks control spaces on a warship.
companionway
A raised and windowed hatchway in a ship's deck, with a ladder leading below and the hooded entrance-hatch to the main cabins.
complement
1. The number of persons in a ship's crew, including officers.
2. A collective term for all of the persons in a ship's crew, including officers.
comprise
To include or contain. As applied to a naval task force, the listing of all assigned units for a single transient purpose or mission (e.g. "The task force comprises Ship A, Ship B, and Ship C"). "Comprise" means exhaustive inclusion – there are not any other parts to the task force, and each ship has a permanent squadron existence, independent of the task force.
concrete ship
A vessel constructed of steel and ferrocement (a type of reinforced concrete) rather than of more traditional materials, such as steel, iron, or wood.
confined waters
Waters where there is little space to maneuver.
conn

To direct a ship or submarine from a position of command. While performing this duty, an officer is said to have the conn.
conning officer
An officer on a naval vessel responsible for instructing the helmsman on the course to steer. While performing this duty, the officer is said to have the conn.
conning tower
1. An armored control tower of an iron or steel warship built between the mid-19th and mid-20th centuries from which the ship was navigated in battle.
2. A tower-like structure on the dorsal (topside) surface of a submarine, serving in submarines built before the mid-20th century as a connecting structure between the bridge and pressure hull and housing instruments and controls from which the periscopes were used to direct the submarine and launch torpedo attacks. Since the mid-20th century, it has been replaced by the sail (United States usage) or fin (European and Commonwealth usage), a structure similar in appearance that no longer plays a role in directing the submarine.
consort
Unpowered Great Lakes vessels, usually a fully loaded schooner, barge, or steamer barge, towed by a larger steamer that would often tow more than one barge. The consort system was used in the Great Lakes from the 1860s to around 1920.
constant bearing, decreasing range (CBDR)
When two boats are approaching each other from any angle and this angle remains the same over time (constant bearing) they are on a collision course. Because of the implication of collision, "constant bearing, decreasing range" has come to mean a problem or an obstacle which is incoming.
container ship
A cargo ship that carries all of her cargo in truck-size intermodal containers.
convoy
A group of ships traveling together for mutual support and protection.
corinthian
An amateur yachter.
corrector
A device used to correct the ship's compass, e.g. by counteracting errors due to the magnetic effects of a steel hull.
corsair
1. A French privateer, especially one from the port of St-Malo.
2. Any privateer or pirate.
3. A ship used by privateers or pirates, especially of French nationality.
4. (corsair (dinghy)) A class of 16-foot (4.9-metre) three-handed sailing dinghy.
corvette

1. A flush-decked sailing warship of the 17th, 18th, and 19th centuries having a single tier of guns, ranked next below a frigate. In the US Navy, it is referred to as a sloop-of-war.
2. A lightly armed and armored warship of the 20th and 21st centuries, smaller than a frigate and capable of transoceanic duty.
cotchel
A partial load.
cottonclad
A steam-powered wooden warship protected from enemy fire by bales of cotton lining its sides, most commonly associated with some of the warships employed by the Confederate States of America during the American Civil War (1861–1865).
counter
The part of the stern above the waterline that extends beyond the rudder stock culminating in a small transom. A long counter increases the waterline length when the boat is heeled, so increasing hull speed. See also truncated counter.
counterflood
To deliberately flood compartments on the opposite side from already flooded ones. Usually done to reduce a list.
country ship
A term used by the British East India Company from the seventeenth to the nineteenth century for a merchant ship owned by local owners east of the Cape of Good Hope which traded within that area and gathered cargoes for shipment west of the Cape to England (later the United Kingdom) by the company's "chartered ships", "extra ships", and "regular ships". "Country ships" were strictly prohibited from trading west of the Cape, which would violate the company's strict monopoly on that trade. Country ships were also important in the opium trade from India into China until supplanted by the faster opium clipper.
course
1. The direction in which a vessel is being steered, usually given in degrees.
2. The lowest square sail on a square rigged mast, except where that mast is the mizzen – in which case the name cro'jack (cross-jack) or mizzen-sail is used.
cowl
1. A ship's ventilator with a bell-shaped top that can be swiveled to catch the wind and force it below.
2. A vertical projection of a ship's funnel that directs the smoke away from the bridge.
coxswain

The helmsman or crew member in command of a boat.
CPO country
The part of a naval vessel containing the residential quarters and wardroom for chief petty officers. CPO country is off-limits to more junior enlisted personnel unless they are there on official business.
crab
A winch used for raising the leeboard, with a barrel for pulling in the staysail sheets.
crabber
A fishing vessel rigged for crab fishing.
crane ship
crane vessel
A ship with a crane and specialized for lifting heavy loads.
cranse iron

The metal fitting mounted at the end of a bowsprit to which the forestay (or jibstay), bobstay, and bowsprit shrouds are attached. It is also where the tack of the outermost headsail is fastened.
crash boat
crash rescue boat
A term used in the United States to describe military high-speed offshore rescue boats, similar in size and performance to motor torpedo boats, used to rescue pilots and aircrews of crashed aircraft.
Crazy Ivan
US Navy slang for a maneuver in which a submerged Soviet or Russian submarine suddenly turns 180 degrees or through 360 degrees to detect submarines following it.
crew
1. On warships and merchant ships, all of those members of a ship's company who are not officers.
2. On leisure vessels with no formal chain of command, all of those persons who are not the skipper or passengers.
crew boat
A vessel specialized for the transportation of offshore support personnel and cargo to and from offshore installations such as oil platforms, drilling rigs, drill ships, dive ships, and wind farms. Also known as a fast support vessel or fast supply vessel.
crew management
The services rendered by specialised shipping companies to manage the human resources and manning of all types of vessels, including recruitment, deployment to vessel, scheduling, and training, as well as the ongoing management and administrative duties of seafarers, such as payroll, travel arrangements, insurance and health schemes, overall career development, and day-to-day welfare. Also known as crewing.
cringle
A loop of rope, usually at the corners of a sail, for fixing the sail to a spar. They are often reinforced with a metal eye.
cro'jack

The square sail set on the lower mizzen yard of a square-rigged ship. Many full-rigged ships would not set a sail in this position, as it would be interfered with by the spanker
cross the line
Cross the equator.
crosstrees
Two horizontal struts at the upper ends of the topmasts of sailboats, used to anchor the shrouds from the topgallant mast. Lateral spreaders for the topmast shrouds (standing back stays).
crow's nest
A masthead constructed with sides and sometimes a roof to shelter the lookouts from the weather, generally by whaling vessels. The term has also become generic for what is properly called a masthead.
cruise ship
A passenger ship used for pleasure voyages, where the voyage itself and the ship's amenities are the purpose of the experience, as are the different destinations along the way. Transportation is not the prime purpose, as cruise ships operate mostly on routes that return passengers to their originating port. A cruise ship contrasts with a passenger liner, which is a passenger ship that provides a scheduled service between published ports primarily as a mode of transportation. Large, prestigious passenger ships used for either purpose are sometimes called ocean liners.
cruiser
1. From the mid-19th century to the mid-20th century, a classification for a wide variety of gun- and sometimes torpedo-armed warships, usually but not always armored, intended for independent scouting, raiding, or commerce protection; some were designed also to provide direct support to a battle fleet. Cruisers carried out functions performed previously by the cruising ships (sailing frigates and sloops-of-war) of the Age of Sail.
2. From the early to the mid-20th century, a type of armored warship with varying armament and of various sizes, but always smaller than a battleship and larger than a destroyer, capable of both direct support of a battle fleet and of independent operations, armed with guns and sometimes torpedoes.
3. After the mid-20th century, various types of warships of intermediate size armed with guided missiles and sometimes guns, intended for air defense of aircraft carriers and associated task forces or for anti-ship missile attacks against such forces; virtually indistinguishable from large destroyers since the late 20th century.
4. A yacht with one or more cabins containing the facilities for living aboard, thus capable of making voyages.
crutches
Metal Y-shaped pins used to fix oars while rowing.
cuddy
A small cabin in a boat; a cabin, for the use of the captain, in the after part of a sailing ship under the poop deck.
Cunningham
A line invented by Briggs Cunningham, used to control the shape of a sail.
cunt splice

A join between two lines, similar to an eye-splice, where each rope end is joined to the other a short distance along, making an opening that closes under tension.
cuntline
The "valley" between the strands of a rope or cable. Before serving a section of laid rope, e.g. to protect it from chafing, it may be "wormed" by laying yarns in the cuntlines, giving that section an even cylindrical shape.
cut and run
When wanting to make a quick escape, a ship might cut lashings to sails or cables for anchors, causing damage to the rigging, or losing an anchor, but shortening the time needed to make ready by bypassing the proper procedures.
cut of his jib
The "cut" of a sail refers to its shape. Since this would often vary between ships, it could be used both to identify a familiar vessel at a distance, and to judge the possible sailing qualities of an unknown one. During the 16th and 17th centuries, the ships of different nations used visually distinctive types of jibs that could be determined at a distance, providing an easy way to determine friend from foe. Also used figuratively of people.
cutter

A typical cutter rigging: one mast bearing a fore-and-aft-rigged mainsail (A) and foresail (forestaysail) (B), a bowsprit (C), a jib (D), and a flying jib (E)

1. A sailing vessel defined by its rig. In European waters this is a single-masted fore and aft rig with two or more headsails In North American waters, the definition also considers whether or not the bowsprit is permanently fixed and also takes into account the position of the mast. A standing (permanently fixed) bowsprit and a forward mast position, but with two or more headsails would be classed as a sloop in the North American definition. A running bowsprit, a forestay (carrying a staysail) that is fixed to the stemhead, a jib that is set flying and a mast position that is more aft is a cutter.
2. A type of ship's boat powered by sail or oars, though more optimised for sail than many types of ship's boat.
3. A small- or medium-sized vessel used by governmental agencies or law enforcement in the exercise of official authority, such as harbor pilots' cutters, US Coast Guard cutters, and UK Border Agency cutters.
4. A type of decked sailing vessel originating in the early 18th century designed for speed. Many were used as small warships. Originally cutter referred only to a type of hull, but it came to refer to the rig, which was single-masted with both fore-and-aft and square sails. A cutter rig had very large sail areas available for use in light winds.
cutting out
A surprise attack by small boats, often at night, against an anchored vessel in which the small-boat crews boarded and captured or destroyed the target vessel. Cutting out became a popular tactic in the latter part of the 18th century and saw extensive use during the Napoleonic Wars. Cutting out was still in use in the mid-19th century, in conflicts such as the Mexican-American War and American Civil War.
cutwater
The forward curve of the stem of a ship.

Contents: Top	A	B	C	D	E	F	G	H	I	J	K	L	M	N	O	P	Q	R	S	T	U	V	W	X	Y	Z	See also	References

== D ==
daggerboard
A type of light centerboard that is lifted vertically; sometimes in pairs, with the leeward one lowered when beating.
dan
dan-buoy
A temporary marker buoy consisting of a long pole with flag and/or light at the top and, lower down, a float and a ballast weight to make it float vertically. May be used with or without an anchor to attach it to the sea bed. In naval use often marks a swept channel created by minesweeping. In other uses may mark fishing equipment (nets or pots), an anchor, or, most commonly, is attached to a lifebuoy to throw into the sea to mark the position of a man overboard.
dandy
1. A rig with a small mizzen abaft the steering post.
2. In British usage, another name for a yawl.
3. In British usage, a small after-sail on a yawl.
danlayer
A mine warfare vessel, usually a small trawler, fitted for laying dans. Danlayers served as a part of minesweeping flotillas during and immediately after World War II (1939–1945).
dart
To run dart; to run dead before the wind.
davit
1. A spar formerly used on board ships as a crane to hoist the flukes of the anchor to the top of the bow without injuring the sides of the ship.
2. A crane, often working in pairs and usually made of steel, used to lower things over the side of a ship, including lifeboats.
Davy Jones's Locker
An idiom for the bottom of the sea.
day beacon
An unlighted fixed structure equipped with a dayboard for daytime identification.
day-blink
The moment at dawn where, from some point on the mast, a lookout can see above low-lying mist around the ship.
dayboard
The daytime identifier of an aid to navigation presenting one of several standard shapes (square, triangle, or rectangle) and colors (red, green, white, orange, yellow, or black).
day boat
1. A sailing boat without overnight accommodation, sometimes with a small cabin, used for pleasure sailing. Typically around 20 feet (6.1 m) in length.
2. (United States): a steamboat built for daytime service; as opposed to a night boat.
dead ahead
Exactly ahead; directly ahead; directly in front.
dead horse
Debt owed for advanced pay. The "flogging a dead horse" ceremony at sea celebrated discharge of the debt.
dead in the water
Not moving (used only when a vessel is afloat and neither tied up nor anchored). The term is abbreviated to DIW by the US Navy. It is often used to indicate that a pirate or drug runner vessel has been immobilised.
dead run
See running.
dead slow
See steerageway.
dead wake
The trail of a fading disturbance in the water. See also wake.
deadeye
A wooden block with three holes (but no pulleys) spliced to a shroud. It adjusts the tension in the standing rigging of large sailing vessels, by lacing through the holes with a lanyard to the deck. It performs the same job as a turnbuckle.
deadhead
A snag.
deadlight
A strong shutter fitted over a porthole or other opening that can be closed in bad weather.
dead reckoning
A method of navigation that estimates a ship's position from the distance run measured by the log and the course steered. If corrections for factors such as tide and leeway are then made, this provides an estimated position. Dead reckoning contrasts with fixing a position with astronomical navigation or satellite navigation. Some sources consider that a dead reckoning position does include adjustments for wind and tide, so care is needed in interpretation of this term.
deadrise
The angle of the hull surface, relative to horizontal, as measured on either side of the keel on a line drawn towards the turn of the bilge. Without any other qualifier, it is taken at the midships cross-section of the hull. This can be expressed in degrees or sometimes as a vertical linear measure (such as inches) at a standard distance from the keel. A hull with a lot of deadrise has an obvious "V" shape to the bottom of the hull, whereas no deadrise denotes sheer sides and a flat-bottomed hull. It is usually taken to be one of several measures of the "sharpness" of a hull. It can also be referred to as the "rise of floor".
deadwood
In a traditional wooden hull, blocks of timber on the top of the keel that form the shape of the hull where its section is too narrow for the method of construction employed elsewhere. It is often used forward of the sternpost.
death roll
In a keel boat, the act of broaching to windward, putting the spinnaker pole into the water and causing a crash-gybe of the boom and mainsail, which sweep across the deck and plunge down into the water. During a death roll, the boat rolls from side to side, becoming gradually more unstable until either it capsizes or the skipper reacts correctly to prevent it.
debarcation

The process of leaving a ship or aircraft, or removing goods from a ship or aircraft.
debunk
The process of removing fuel from a vessel. After a shipwreck, a "debunkering" operation will be performed in an effort to minimize damage and protect the environment from fuel spills.
deck
1. The top of a ship or vessel; the surface that is removed to accommodate the seating area.
2. Any of the structures forming the approximately horizontal surfaces in the ship's general structure. Unlike flats, they are a structural part of the ship.
deck gun
A gun mounted on the deck of a submarine for use in surface combat. Common on submarines of the first half of the 20th century, deck guns became obsolete as submarines became capable of sustained underwater operations after World War II.
deck hand

A person whose job involves aiding the deck supervisor in (un)mooring, anchoring, maintenance, and general evolutions on deck.
deck supervisor
The person in charge of all evolutions and maintenance on deck; sometimes split into two groups: forward deck supervisor and aft deck supervisor.
deckhead
The underside of the deck above. The inside of the boat is normally paneled over to hide the structure, pipes, electrical wires. It can be in thin wood planks, often covered with a vinyl lining, or in thin PVC or now even in fiberglass planks.
deckhouse
A cabin that protrudes above a ship's deck.
decks awash
A situation in which the deck of the vessel is partially or wholly submerged, possibly as a result of excessive listing or a loss of buoyancy.
decommission
To formally take (a naval vessel) out of active service, after which the vessel is said to be out of commission or decommissioned. Sometimes used less formally to mean taking a commercial ship out of service.
degaussing
A process to reduce a warship's magnetic signature.
demurrage
A fee paid by a charter party to a shipowner if the time taken to load or unload a vessel exceeds the laytime – the amount of time stipulated for loading or unloading – specified in a voyage charter.
depot ship
A ship that acts as a mobile or fixed base for other ships and submarines or that supports a naval base.
depth of hold
The distance between the underside of the main deck (or its supporting beams) and the top of the limber boards (the part of the ceiling that lies alongside the keelson), measured at the middle frame. It is one of the key measurements in working out the measurement tonnage in most systems.
derrick
A lifting device composed of one mast or pole and a boom or jib hinged freely at the bottom.
despatch
A fee paid by a shipowner to a charter party if the time taken to load or unload a vessel is less than the laytime – the amount of time stipulated for loading or unloading – specified in a voyage charter.
despatch boat
An alternate spelling of dispatch boat.
destroyer
A type of fast and maneuverable small warship introduced in the 1890s to protect capital ships from torpedo boat attack, and since increased in size and capabilities to become a long-endurance warship intended to escort larger vessels in a fleet, convoy, or battle group and defend them against submarines, surface ships, aircraft, or missiles. Originally torpedo boat destroyer. In US Navy slang, also called a tin can or small boy.
destroyer depot ship
See destroyer tender.
destroyer escort
A US Navy term for a smaller, lightly armed warship built in large numbers during World War II (and in smaller numbers thereafter), cheaper, slower, and less-well-armed than a destroyer but larger and more heavily armed than a corvette and designed to escort convoys of merchant ships or naval auxiliaries or second-line naval forces. Employed primarily for anti-submarine warfare, but also used to provide some protection against aircraft and smaller surface ships. Generally known as frigates in other navies, and designated as such in the US Navy as well by the 1970s.
destroyer leader
A large destroyer suitable for commanding a flotilla of destroyers or other small warships; a type of flotilla leader.
destroyer tender
A naval auxiliary ship designed to provide maintenance support to a flotilla of destroyers or other small warships. Known in British English as a destroyer depot ship.
devil seam
The devil was possibly a slang term for the garboard seam, hence "between the devil and the deep blue sea" being an allusion to keel hauling, but a more popular version seems to be the seam between the waterway and the stanchions, which would be difficult to get at, requiring a cranked caulking iron, and a restricted swing of the caulking mallet.
devil to pay

"Paying" the devil is sealing the devil seam. It is a difficult and unpleasant job (with no resources) because of the shape of the seam (up against the stanchions) or if the devil refers to the garboard seam, it must be done with the ship slipped or careened.
devil's claw
A type of chain stopper often used to secure an anchor in its hawsepipe. Consists of a two-pronged hook that fits over a link of chain, a turnbuckle and a short chain fastened to a strong point.
dhow
The generic name of a number of traditional sailing vessels with one or more masts with lateen sails used in the Red Sea and Indian Ocean region, typically weighing 300 to 500 tons, with a long, thin hull. They are trading vessels primarily used to carry heavy items, like fruit, fresh water, or merchandise. Crews vary from about thirty to around twelve, depending on the size of the vessel.
diamonds
Glass prisms that were laid between the wooden deck planks to allow natural light below were referred to as diamonds due to the sparkle they gave off in the sunlight.
dinghy
1. A type of small boat, often carried or towed as a ship's boat by a larger vessel.
2. A small racing yacht or recreational open sailing boat, often used for beginner training rather than sailing full-sized yachts.
3. Utility dinghies are usually rowboats or have an outboard motor, but some are rigged for sailing.
dipping the eye

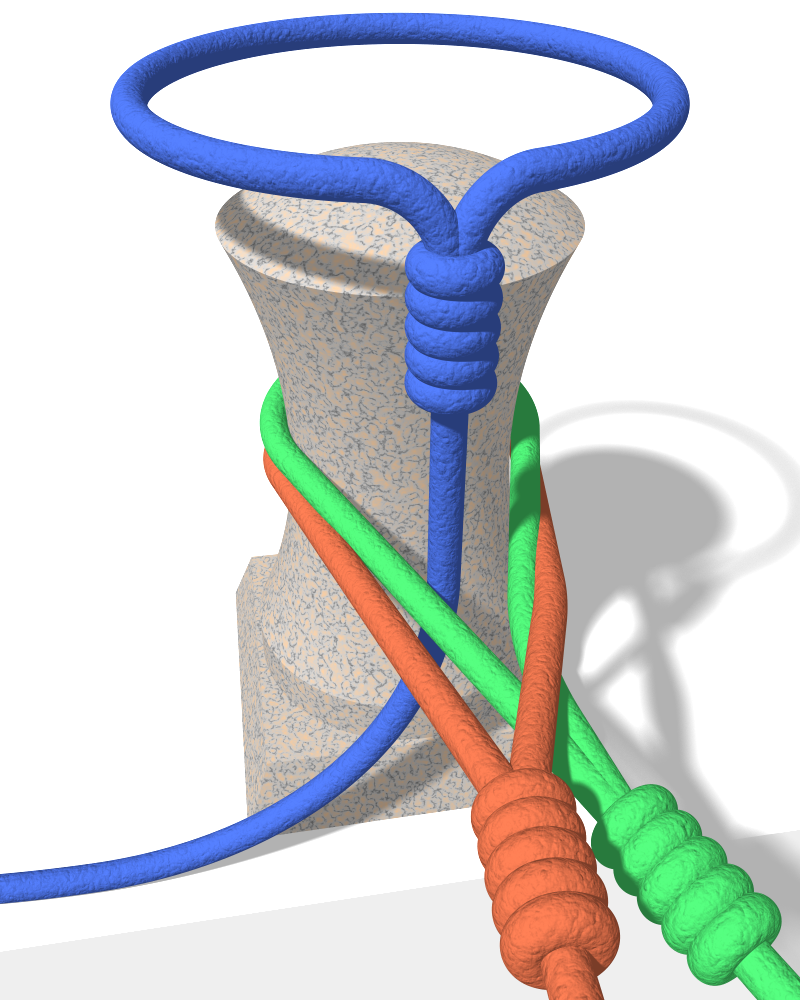
Dipping the eye

A method of attaching more than one hawser to a single bollard, so that each can be lifted off without disturbing the other(s). The second hawser is passed under the first, then up through the eye of the first (hence the name), before being secured over the bollard.
dipping the flag
A method of rendering honors at sea by lowering and raising a ship's flag.
directional light
A light illuminating a sector or very narrow angle and intended to mark a direction to be followed.
disembark
disembarcation

dispatch boat

A vessel ranging in size from a small boat to a large ship tasked to carry military dispatches from ship to ship, from ship to shore, or, occasionally, from shore to shore.
displacement
The weight of water displaced by the immersed volume of a ship's hull, exactly equivalent to the weight of the whole ship.
displacement hull
A hull designed to travel through the water, rather than planing over it.
disposable ship

A barely seaworthy ship of the 19th century assembled from large timbers lashed or pegged together and designed to make a single voyage from North America to the United Kingdom and then to be disassembled so that her timbers could be sold, thus avoiding high British taxes on lumber imported as cargo. When British taxes on imported lumber fell, the construction of disposable ships ceased.
disrate
To reduce in rank or rating; to demote.
distinctive mark
A flag flown to distinguish ships of one seagoing service of a given country from ships of the country's other seagoing service(s) when ships of more than one of the country's seagoing services fly the same ensign.
ditty bag
Bag or box for personal items.
division
1. Especially in the late 19th and early 20th centuries, a permanent battle formation of a fleet, often smaller than a squadron, equipped and trained to operate as a tactical unit under the overall command of a higher command, such as a fleet or squadron.
2. Especially in modern usage, an administrative naval command, smaller than a squadron and often subordinate to an administrative squadron, responsible for the manning, training, supply, and maintenance of a group of ships or submarines but not for directing their operations at sea.
Divisional Transport Officer

In British usage, a shore-based naval officer responsible for the efficient working of the transports and boats of the flotilla, division, or squadron under his charge.
dock
1. In American usage, a fixed structure attached to shore to which a vessel is secured when in port, generally synonymous with pier and wharf, except that pier tends to refer to structures used for tying up commercial ships and to structures extending from shore for use in fishing, while dock refers more generally to facilities used for tying up ships or boats, including recreational craft.
2. In British usage, the body of water between two piers or wharves that accommodates vessels tied up at the piers or wharves.
3. To tie up along a pier or wharf.
dockyard
A facility where ships or boats are built and repaired. Routinely used as a synonym for shipyard, although dockyard is sometimes associated more closely with a facility used for maintenance and basing activities, while shipyard sometimes is associated more closely with a facility used in construction.
dodger
A hood forward of a hatch or cockpit to protect the crew from wind and spray. Can be soft or hard.
dog

Device to secure doors and hatches. Typically used for watertight openings, but can apply elsewhere. "Dogging the hatches" is a common phrase.
dog watch
A short watch period, generally half the usual time (e.g., a two-hour watch rather than a four-hour one). Such watches might be included in order to rotate the system over different days for fairness, or to allow both watches to eat their meals at approximately normal times.
doghouse
A slang term (in the US, mostly) for a raised portion of a ship's deck. A doghouse is usually added to improve headroom below or to shelter a hatch.
dogvane
A small weather vane, sometimes improvised with a scrap of cloth, yarn, or other light material mounted within sight of the helmsman. See tell-tale.
doldrums

The equatorial trough, with special reference to the light and variable nature of the winds generally encountered there.
dolly winch
A small winch mounted on the windlass, used as an alternative to the brails winch when that is obstructed in some way (e.g. by deck cargo).
dolphin
A structure consisting of a number of piles driven into the seabed or riverbed as a marker.
dolphin striker
A spar protruding vertically beneath a bowsprit, usually attached to the boswprit cap, used provide a mechanically advantageous run for the martingale stay, and other ropes of a ship's rigging.
donkey engine
A small auxiliary engine used either to start a larger engine or independently, e.g. for pumping water on steamships.
donkeyman
One of a ship's engineering crew. Often a crewman responsible for maintaining a steam donkey, or any machinery other than the main engines. On some ships, the Petty Officer in charge of engineroom ratings.
dorade box
A dorade box (also called a dorade vent, collector box, or simply a "ventilator") is a type of vent that permits the passage of air in and out of the cabin or engine room of a boat while keeping rain, spray, and sea wash out.
dory

A shallow-draft, lightweight boat, about 5 to 7 metres (16 to 23 ft) long, with high sides, a flat bottom, and sharp bows. Traditionally used as fishing boats, both in coastal waters and in the open sea.
double-banked
(of the arrangement of oars on a boat) having two oarsmen seated on each thwart, each of whom operates one oar on their side of the boat. This contrasts with single-banked, where only one oarsman is seated on each thwart operating one oar on one side of the boat, with the oars alternating between port and starboard along the length of the boat. A third arrangement is to have one rower on each thwart working two oars, one on each side of the boat.
double-shotted
The practice of loading smoothbore cannon with two cannonballs.
doubling the angle on the bow
A technique for establishing the distance from a point on land, such as a headland that is being passed. This is a type of running bearing which requires no plotting on the chart. The ship is sailed on a constant course and speed. The distance shown on the log is noted when the relative bearing of a fixed point is taken, and the increase in that bearing is watched until it is twice the original bearing, and the log is read again. The distance travelled between the two bearings is the distance of the ship from the fixed point when the second bearing was taken. Allowances for tidal streams may or may not be allowed for, depending on the accuracy required.
Dover cliffs
A slang term for very rough seas with large white-capped waves.
downbound
1. Travel downstream, with a following current.
2. Eastward travel in the Great Lakes region (terminology used by the Great Lakes St. Lawrence Seaway Development Corporation).
downflooding
The entry of water through any opening into the hull or superstructure of an undamaged vessel, such as an open door or porthole, loose or open hatch, ventilator opening, etc. Downflooding can occur due to a ship's trim, if she heels or lists, or if she becomes totally or partially submerged.
downhaul
A line used to control either a mobile spar, or the shape of a sail. A downhaul can also be used to retrieve a sail back on deck.
drabbler
An extra strip of canvas secured below a bonnet, further to increase the area of a course.
draft

The depth of a ship's keel below the waterline.
dragger
1. A fishing trawler.
2. A dredger.
dragon boat
One of a family of traditional paddled long boats of various designs and sizes found throughout Asia, Africa, and the Pacific islands. For competitive events, they are generally rigged with decorative Chinese dragon heads and tails. Dragon boat races are traditionally held during the annual summer solstice festival.
draught

dreadnought
A type of battleship designed with an "all-big-gun" armament layout in which the ship's primary gun power resided in a primary battery of its largest guns intended for use at long range, with other gun armament limited to small weapons intended for close-range defense against torpedo boats and other small warships. Most, but not all, dreadnoughts also had steam turbine propulsion. Predominant from 1906, dreadnoughts differed from earlier steam battleships, retroactively dubbed predreadnoughts, which had only a few large guns, relied on an intermediate secondary battery used at shorter ranges for most of their offensive power, and had triple-expansion steam engines.
dredger
A vessel specialized for use in the excavation of material from a water environment and equipped with heavy machinery for this purpose.
dressing overall
To string International Code of Signals flags, arranged at random, from stemhead to masthead, between mastheads (if the vessel has more than one mast), and then down to the taffrail, on a ship in harbor as a sign of celebration of a national, local, or personal anniversary, event, holiday, or occasion. When a ship is properly dressed overall, ensigns fly at each masthead unless displaced by another flag (e.g. that of a flag officer on board), in addition to the ensign flown in the usual position at the stern.
dressing down
1. Treating old sails with oil or wax to renew them.
2. A verbal reprimand.
dressing lines
Lines running from stemhead to masthead, between mastheads, and then down to the taffrail, to which flags are attached when a ship is dressed overall.
drifter
A type of fishing boat designed to catch herring in a long drift net, long used in the Netherlands and Great Britain.
drink
Overboard and into the water (e.g. "it fell into the drink").
driver
The large sail flown from the mizzen gaff.
driver-mast
The fifth mast of a six-masted barquentine or gaff schooner. It is preceded by the jigger mast and followed by the spanker mast. The sixth mast of the only seven-masted vessel, the gaff schooner Thomas W. Lawson, was normally called the pusher-mast.
drogher
See disposable ship.
drogue
A device to slow a boat down in a storm so that it does not speed excessively down the slope of a wave and crash into the next one. It is generally constructed of heavy flexible material in the shape of a cone. See also sea anchor.
drudging
A technique of maintaining steerageway when going downstream with neither engine nor wind to sail. The vessel uses its anchor to draw itself head-to-stream, then lifts the anchor and drifts stern-first downstream, ferry gliding to maintain position within the stream. As steerage begins to reduce, the vessel anchors again and then repeats the whole procedure as required.
drydock
A narrow basin or vessel used for the construction, maintenance, and repair of ships, boats, and other watercraft that can be flooded to allow a load to be floated in, then drained to allow that load to come to rest on a dry platform.
drying harbour

A harbour where the water wholly or partly recedes as the tide goes out, leaving any vessel moored there aground.
dump scow
A type of scow designed to dump waste material at sea.
dunnage
1. Loose packing material used to protect a ship's cargo from damage during transport. See also fardage.
2. Personal baggage.
Dutch barge

Any of several types of traditional flat-bottomed shoal-draught sailing barge, originally used for carrying cargo in the Zuyder Zee and on the rivers of the Netherlands.
Dutch built
Term of abuse implying shoddiness or (when directed at a person) stupidity or stubbornness, usually embellished with other oaths and insults tagged on fore and aft.

Contents: Top	A	B	C	D	E	F	G	H	I	J	K	L	M	N	O	P	Q	R	S	T	U	V	W	X	Y	Z	See also	References

== E ==
earings
Small lines by which the uppermost corners of the largest sails are secured to the yardarms.
East Indiaman
Any ship operating under charter or license to the East India Company (England), or to the Danish East India Company, French East India Company, Dutch East India Company, Portuguese East India Company, or Swedish East India Company from the 17th to the 19th centuries.
echo sounding
The measurement of the depth of a body of water using a SONAR device. See also sounding and swinging the lead.
embayed
A condition in which a sailing vessel (especially one that sails poorly to windward) is confined between two capes or headlands by a wind blowing directly onshore.
en echelon

Diagram showing the Moltke-class battlecruiser with its central guns arranged en echelon.

An arrangement of gun turrets whereby the turret on one side of the ship is placed further aft than the one on the other side, so that both turrets can fire to either side.
engine order telegraph

A communications device used by the pilot to order engineers in the engine room to power the vessel at a certain desired speed.
engine room
One of the machinery spaces of a vessel, usually the largest one, containing the ship's prime mover (usually a diesel or steam engine or a gas or steam turbine). Larger vessels may have more than one engine room.
ensign
1. (flag) The principal flag or banner flown by a ship to indicate her nationality.
2. (rank) The lowest grade of commissioned officer in the US Navy.
escort carrier
A type of aircraft carrier, smaller and slower than a fleet carrier, used by some navies in World War II to escort convoys, ferry aircraft, conduct anti-submarine warfare, and provide air support for amphibious operations.
estimated position
An approximate geographical position obtained by making allowances for leeway, tide, and currents to a dead reckoning position (which is calculated from the distance run and the course steered).
evaporator
A piece of ship's equipment used to produce fresh drinking water from sea water by distillation.
executive officer
The officer second in command on a warship. Also called "X.O." in the United States and "Number One" in the Royal Navy and Commonwealth navies.
express boat
An alternative term for a flyboat, a high-speed canal boat operating in England in the 1830s and 1840s.
extra ship
A term used by the British East India Company from the seventeenth to the nineteenth century for merchant ships it hired to make voyages for it between England (later the United Kingdom) and ports east of the Cape of Good Hope, a trade over which the company held a strict monopoly. "Extra ships" were chartered for a single round-trip voyage beginning during a single sailing season (September to April) and augmented the voyages of "regular ships", which were merchant ships under long-term charter to make repeated voyages for the company over many seasons. However, if an "extra ship" operated well and the company needed its services, the company often chartered it repeatedly over a number of seasons.
extremis

The point under International Rules of the Road (Navigation Rules) at which the privileged (or stand-on) vessel on collision course with a burdened (or give-way) vessel determines it must maneuver to avoid a collision. Prior to extremis, the privileged vessel must maintain course and speed and the burdened vessel must maneuver to avoid collision.
eye splice
A closed loop or eye at the end of a line, rope, cable, etc. It is made by unraveling its end and joining it to itself by intertwining it into the lay of the line. Eye splices are very strong and compact and are frequently employed in moorings and docking lines, among other uses.

Contents: Top	A	B	C	D	E	F	G	H	I	J	K	L	M	N	O	P	Q	R	S	T	U	V	W	X	Y	Z	See also	References

== F ==
factory ship
A large oceangoing vessel with extensive on-board facilities for processing and freezing caught fish or whales. Some also serve as mother ships for smaller fishing or whaling vessels. Those used for processing fish are also known as fish processing vessels.
fair
1. A smooth curve, usually referring to a line of the hull with minimum localised deviations.
2. To make something flush.
3. A line is fair when it has a clear run.
4. A wind or current is fair when it offers an advantage to a boat.
fair winds and following seas
A blessing wishing the recipient a safe journey and good fortune.
fairlead
A device used to keep a line or chain running in the correct direction or to give it a fair lead to prevent it rubbing or fouling.
fairing
1. (noun) A structure that improves the streamlining of a vessel.
2. (verb) The process of making a curve or structure fair.
fairwater
1. A structure that improves the streamlining of a vessel.
2. On submarines: The superstructure ( sail ) of the boat. The fairwater serves as a streamlined housing for the submarine's periscopes and other sensor masts, as well as the air intake, snorkel masts (if applicable). It also provides a degree of elevation above the sea, and is therefore typically equipped with a small bridge (nautical). If the submarine is equipped with a conning tower, this structure will also be located somewhere inside of the fairwater.
fairway
1. A navigable channel (e.g., in a harbor or offshore) that is the usual course taken by vessels in the area.
2. In military and naval terms, a channel from offshore, in a river, or in a harbor that has enough depth to accommodate the draft of large vessels.
fake
A single turn of rope in a coil or on a drum. A group of fakes is known as a tier. See also fake down.
fake down
To lay a coil of rope down so that it will run easily; that is, with rope feeding off the top of the coil and the bitter end at the bottom. Often confused with flake. See also range.
falkuša
A traditional fishing boat with a lateen sail on a single mast used by fishermen from the town of Komiža on the Adriatic island of Vis.
fall
The part of the tackle that is hauled upon.
fall off

To change the direction of sail so as to point in a direction that is more downwind; to bring the bow leeward. This is the opposite of pointing up or heading up.
fantail
The aft end of a ship, also known as the poop deck.
fardage
Wood placed in the bottom of a ship to keep cargo dry. See also dunnage.
fashion boards
Loose boards that slide in grooves to close off a companionway or cabin entrance.
fast
Fastened or held firmly (e.g. "fast aground": stuck on the seabed; or "made fast": tied securely).
fast attack craft
A small, fast, agile warship armed with anti-ship missiles, guns, or torpedoes. The fast attack craft replaced the torpedo boat during the second half of the 20th century in the role of a cheap, offensively-oriented inshore warship.
fast combat support ship
The largest type of US Navy combat logistics ship, designed to serve as a combined oiler, ammunition ship, and supply ship. The first fast combat support ship entered service in the mid-1960s.
fast supply vessel
fast support vessel

fathom
1. A unit of length equal to 6 feet (1.8 m), roughly measured as the distance between a man's outstretched hands. Particularly used in sounding as a measurement of the depth of a body of water.
2. To measure the depth of water; to engage in sounding.
fathomer
A person engaged in sounding to determine the depth of water.
fathometer
A depth finder that uses sound waves to determine the depth of water.
favored side
The side of the course that gets you to the next mark faster, due to more wind, favorable shifts, less current, smaller waves, etc.
felucca
A traditional wooden sailing boat with a rig consisting of one or two lateen sails, used in protected waters of the Red Sea and eastern Mediterranean and particularly along the Nile in Egypt and Sudan, as well as in Iraq.
fend off
A command given to the crew to stop what they are now doing and to immediately manually prevent the boat from banging into the docks or other boats.
fender
A flexible bumper used in boating to keep boats from banging into docks or each other. Often an old car tire.
ferry

A merchant ship used to carry passengers, and sometimes vehicles and cargo, across a body of water.
ferry glide
To hold a vessel against and at an angle to the current/stream such that the vessel moves sideways over the bottom due to the effect of the current operating on the upstream side of the vessel.
ferry slip
A specialized docking facility designed to receive a ferryboat or train ferry.
fetch
1. The distance across water a wind or waves have traveled.
2. To reach a mark without tacking.
fid
1. A tapered wooden tool used for separating the strands of rope for splicing.
2. A bar used to fix an upper mast in place.
Fiddley
the vertical space above a vessel's engine room extending into its stack, usually covered by an iron grating. Also applied to the framework around the opening itself
fife rail
A freestanding pinrail surrounding the base of a mast and used for securing that mast's sails' halyards with a series of belaying pins.
Fifie
A sailing boat with two masts with a standard rig consisting of a main dipping lug sail and a mizzen standing lug sail. Developed in Scotland and used for commercial fishing from the 1850s until the 20th century.
fig
US Navy slang for a guided-missile frigate, especially of the Oliver Hazard Perry class, derived from its class designation ("FFG").
fight his ship
To fight his ship (or to fight her ship) is a naval term that denotes a captain taking their vessel into combat or directing their vessel in combat.
fighting top
An enlarged top designed to allow gunfire downward onto an enemy ship. A fighting top could have small guns installed in it or could serve as a platform for snipers armed with muskets or rifles.
figure of eight
A stopper knot.
figurehead
A symbolic image, particularly a carved effigy, at the head of a traditional sailing ship or early steamer.
fin
A term used in European and Commonwealth countries for a tower-like structure on the dorsal (topside) surface of a submarine; called a sail in the United States.
fine
Narrow in appearance from the vantage point of a lookout or other person viewing activity in the vicinity of a ship, e.g. another ship off the starboard bow with her bow or stern facing the viewer's ship could be described as "fine on the starboard bow" of the viewer's ship.
fine lines
Descriptive term for a vessel with a hull shape designed for an efficient flow of water around the hull. Simply described by comparing the hull shape to a rectangular cuboid with the same length, breadth and height as the submerged part of the hull. The more that you have to carve off that cuboid to get the hull's shape, the finer the lines. More accurately this is measured as the block coefficient or the prismatic coefficient.
fireboat
A specialized vessel equipped with firefighting equipment such as pumps and nozzles for fighting shipboard and shoreline fires.
fireman

1. A job associated with tending the fire for a boiler.
2. A US Navy rate in the engineering department equivalent to seaman.
fire ship
A ship loaded with flammable materials and explosives and sailed into an enemy port or fleet either already burning or ready to be set alight by its crew (who would then abandon it) in order to collide with and set fire to enemy ships.
fire room

The compartment in which a ship's boilers or furnaces are stoked and fired.
first-rate
The classification for the largest sailing warships of the 17th through the 19th centuries. Such vessels often had up to three masts, 850+ crew, and 100+ guns.
first lieutenant
1. In the Royal Navy, the senior lieutenant on board; responsible to the commanding officer for the domestic affairs of the ship's company. Also known as 'Jimmy the One' or 'Number One'. Removes his cap when visiting the mess decks as a token of respect for the privacy of the crew in those quarters. Officer in charge of cables on the forecastle.
2. In the US Navy, the officer on a ship serving as the senior person in charge of all deck hands.
first mate
The second-in-command of a commercial ship.
fish
1. To repair a mast or spar with a fillet of wood.
2. To secure an anchor on the side of a ship for sea (otherwise known as "catting".)
3. A slang term for a self-propelled torpedo.
fisherman's reef
A sailing tactic for handling winds too strong for the sail area hoisted when reefing the sails is not feasible or possible. The headsail is set normally while the mainsail is let out until it is constantly luffing. This creates a loss of force on the main and also reduces the efficiency of the headsail while still retaining sailing control of the vessel.
fisherman's sail
On a staysail schooner, the fisherman is a quadrilateral sail set between the two masts above the main staysail. It is used in light to moderate airs.
fitting-out
The period after a ship is launched during which all the remaining construction of the ship is completed and she is readied for sea trials and delivery to her owners.
fixed propeller
A propeller mounted on a rigid shaft protruding from the hull of a vessel, usually driven by an inboard motor; steering must be done using a rudder. See also outboard motor and sterndrive.
flag hoist
A number of signal flags strung together to convey a message, e.g. "England expects that every man will do his duty".
flag of convenience
The business practice of registering a merchant ship in a sovereign state different from that of the ship's owners, and flying that state's civil ensign on the ship. The practice allows the ship's owner to reduce operating costs or avoid the regulations of the owner's country.
flag officer
1. A commissioned officer senior enough to be entitled to fly a flag to mark the ship or installation under his or her command, in English-speaking countries usually referring to the senior officers of a navy, specifically to those who hold any of the admiral ranks and in some cases to those holding the rank of commodore. In modern American usage, additionally applied to U.S. Coast Guard, National Oceanic and Atmospheric Administration Commissioned Officer Corps, and U.S. Public Health Service Commissioned Corps officers and general officers in the U.S. Army, U.S. Air Force, and U.S. Marine Corps entitled to fly their own flags.
2. A formal rank in the mid-19th century United States Navy, conveyed temporarily upon senior captains in command of squadrons of ships, soon rendered obsolete by the creation of the ranks of commodore and rear admiral.
flagship
1. A vessel used by the commanding officer of a group of naval ships. The term derives from the custom of a commander of such a group of ships, characteristically a flag officer, flying a distinguishing flag aboard the ship on which he or she is embarked.
2. Used more loosely, the lead ship in a fleet of naval or commercial vessels, typically the first, largest, fastest, most heavily armed, or, in terms of media coverage, best-known.
flake
To set down in folds, as in stowing a sail or to range a cable on deck so that it is clear to run. Not to be confused with fake down.
flank
The maximum speed of a ship. Faster than "full speed".
flare
1. A curvature of the topsides outward towards the gunwale.
2. A pyrotechnic signalling device, usually used to indicate distress.
flatback
A Great Lakes slang term for a vessel without any self-unloading equipment.
flatboat

A rectangular, flat-bottomed boat with square ends used to transport freight and passengers on inland waterways in the United States during the 18th and 19th centuries.
flattop
A slang term for an aircraft carrier.
fleet
1. Naval fleet: The highest operational echelon of command of ships commanded by a single person in a navy, and typically the largest type of naval formation commanded by a single person. In modern times, usually (but not necessarily) a permanent formation.
2. During the Age of Sail, a Royal Navy term for any naval command larger than a squadron in size, or commanded by a rear admiral and composed of five ships-of-the-line and any number of smaller vessels.
3. Merchant fleet, a collective term for the merchant marine (known in the United Kingdom and Commonwealth countries as the merchant navy) of a particular country.
4. Fishing fleet: A term for an aggregate of commercial fishing vessels, commonly used either to describe all fishing vessels belonging to a single country, operating in a single region, operating out of a particular port, or engaged in particular type of fishing (e.g., the tuna fishing fleet). The term does not imply that the vessels operate as part of a single organization.
5. Informally, any grouping (based on physical proximity or sharing of a common organizational subordination) of naval or civilian vessels.
6. Of a person, to move from one location to another aboard a vessel, or to change positions within a naval organization.
7. To move up a rope – especially when drawing the blocks of a tackle part – to allow a greater advantage in hauling.
8. To cause a rope or chain to slip down the barrel of a capstan or windlass.
9. A former term for the process aboard a vessel of moving deadeyes when the shrouds become too long.
10. A location where barges are secured.
fleet in being
A naval force that extends a controlling influence on maritime operations without ever leaving port by forcing an opposing navy to maintain forces on station to blockade it in port and oppose it if it comes out to fight. A navy which operates its forces as a fleet in being generally seeks to avoid actual combat with an enemy fleet for fear of losing a naval battle and thereby its ability to influence events and activities at sea.
flemish
To coil a line that is not in use so that it lies flat on the deck.
flettner rotor
A spinning cylinder that uses the Magnus effect to harness wind power to propel a ship.
flight deck
A flat deck on an aircraft carrier used for the launch and recovery of aircraft. In the United States Navy, the term flight deck also refers to a helicopter deck on other types of ships.
floating futtock
A futtock that is not attached to the other futtocks in the frame of which it is part. Instead, it is attached to the hull planking, ceiling and other longitudinal members. This demonstrates that building was done either shell-first or was frame-led, with phases of planking, then fitting of futtocks, followed by another band of planking.
flog the glass
The act of vibrating or shaking a half-hour marine sandglass — used until the early 19th century to time the length of a watch — to speed the passage of the sand in order to get off watch duty earlier.
floor
Transverse structural timbers which form that part of the lower frame of a traditional wooden ship's hull that sits immediately above the keel. The frames continue upwards as pieces called futtocks. A keelson is usually fastened over the top of the floors.
floorhead
Any of the upper extremities of the floor of a vessel.
flotilla
1. In naval usage, a group of warships under a single commander that is smaller than a fleet but otherwise not formally defined. A flotilla often is larger than a squadron, and usually is made up of smaller vessels than those assigned to a squadron, but some flotillas are smaller than squadrons and some include larger vessels. In some navies, the term flotilla is reserved for naval formations that operate on inland bodies of water, while the terms fleet and squadron denote naval formations that operate at sea. A flotilla may be a permanent or temporary formation. In modern times, a flotilla sometimes is an administrative naval unit responsible for maintaining and supporting vessels but not for commanding their operations at sea.
2. Informally, a group of naval or civilian vessels operating together or in close proximity to one another.
flotilla holiday
A group of chartered yachts that set out together on the same route.
flotilla leader
A warship suitable for commanding a flotilla of destroyers or other small warships, typically a small cruiser or a large destroyer, in the latter case known as a destroyer leader.
flotsam
Debris or cargo that remains afloat after a shipwreck. See also jetsam.
fluke
The wedge-shaped part of an anchor's arms that digs into the solid bottom beneath a body of water.
flush deck
An upper deck of a vessel that extends unbroken from stem to stern.
flush decker
1. Any vessel with a flush deck.
2. A US Navy destroyer of the World War I-era Caldwell, Wickes, or Clemson class, produced in very large numbers.
flushing board
A board inserted vertically in a cabin entrance.
fluyt

A Dutch transoceanic sailing cargo vessel, square-rigged with two or three masts that were much taller than the masts of a galleon, developed in the 16th century and widely used in the 17th and 18th centuries.
flyboat

1. A light, agile vessel of Dutch origin used in Europe in the late 16th and early 17th centuries. Flyboats were designed as merchant cargo vessels, but many served as auxiliary warships. The flyboat was replaced by the fluyt in the early 17th century.
2. In England, a term used for the Dutch fluyt.
3. A high-speed horsedrawn canal boat operated in England in the 1830s and 1840s. Also called an "express boat" or a "gig boat."
4. A narrowboat operating day and night without mooring on the canal system in England to provide an express cargo service. These "flyboats" were common by 1834 and operated until ca. 1914.
fly by night
A large sail used only for sailing downwind, requiring little attention.
folding propeller
A propeller with folding blades, furling so as to reduce drag on a sailing vessel when not in use.
following sea
Waves going in the same direction as a ship, or within 15° of the heading, at a speed slower than the ship. See overtaking sea for waves travelling faster than the ship.
foo-foo band
An impromptu musical band on late 19th-century sailing vessels, made up from members of the ship's crew.
foot
1. The lower edge of any sail.
2. The bottom of a mast.
3. An Imperial unit of length equivalent to 12 inches (30 cm).
footloose
If the foot of a sail is not secured properly, it is footloose, blowing around in the wind.
footboat
A barge's boat or dinghy.
footrope
Each yard on a square-rigged sailing ship is equipped with a footrope for sailors to stand on while setting or stowing the sails.
force

fore

Toward the bow of a vessel.
fore-and-aft rig
A sailing rig consisting mainly of sails that are set along the line of the keel rather than perpendicular to it. Such sails, and the vessel itself, are said to be fore-and-aft-rigged.
fore-and-afters
Removable wooded beams running along the centre of the hold openings, beneath the hatches that they support.
fore horse
A transverse wooden or iron beam afore the main mast to which the foresail sheet is attached.
forecastle
(pronounced /ˈfoʊksəl/) A partial deck above the upper deck and at the head of the vessel; traditionally the location of the sailors' living quarters. The name is derived from the castle fitted to bear archers in time of war.
foredeck
The portion of the deck that is forward of the forward mast.
forefoot
The lower part of the stem of a ship.
forehold
The forward (i.e., front) part of a hold.
foremast jack
An enlisted sailor, one who is housed before the foremast.
forepeak
The part of the hold of a ship within the angle of the bow.
foresail
1. A fore-and-aft-rigged sail set on the foremast.
2. The lowest sail set on the foremast of a full-rigged ship or other square-rigged vessel.
forestay
A long line or cable reaching from the bow of the vessel to the mastheads, used to support the mast.
forestaysail
A triangular sail set on the forestay.
fother
To cover a leak in a hull with a sail or other piece of canvas, usually by hauling it down the ships side using ropes passing under the keel.
foul
1. Having freedom of motion interfered with by collision or entanglement; entangled; the opposite of clear. For instance, a rope is foul when it does not run straight or smoothly, and an anchor is foul when it is caught on an obstruction.
2. A ship's bottom is foul when it is overgrown with marine life such as barnacles.
3. An area of water treacherous to navigation due to many shallow obstructions such as reefs, sandbars, rocks, etc.
4. A breach of racing rules.
5. Foul the range: To block another vessel from firing her guns at a target.
foulies
A slang term for oilskins, the foul-weather clothing worn by sailors.
founder
To fill with water and sink.
four piper
A term sometimes used to refer to United States Navy four-funneled destroyers of the Bainbridge, Paulding, Wickes, and Clemson classes, all built for service in World War I.
fourth rate
In the British Royal Navy during the first half of the 18th century, a ship-of-the-line mounting between 46 and 60 guns.
frame
A transverse structural member that gives the hull strength and shape. Wooden frames may be sawn, bent, or laminated into shape; planking is then fastened to the frames. In traditional wooden ship building, an individual frame may be made of the following individual parts: floor, several futtocks, then a top timber as the last component closest to the deck. If the hull is built frame-first, these frame components are fastened to each other. In a shell-first (or planking-first) construction, they are only fastened to the hull planking.
freeboard
The height of a ship's hull (excluding the superstructure) above the waterline; the vertical distance from the current waterline to the lowest point on the highest continuous watertight deck. This usually varies from one part to another.
freighter
A cargo ship.
frigate
1. In the 17th century, any warship built for speed and maneuverability.
2. In the 18th and early 19th centuries, a sailing warship with a single continuous gun deck, typically used for patrolling, blockading, etc., but not in line of battle.
3. In the second half of the 19th century, a type of warship combining sail and steam propulsion, typically of ironclad timber construction, with all guns on one deck.
4. In the 20th and 21st centuries, a warship, smaller than a destroyer, originally introduced during World War II as an anti-submarine vessel but now general-purpose.
5. In the US Navy from the 1950s until the 1970s, a type of guided-missile antiaircraft ship built on a destroyer-sized hull, all of which were reclassified as "guided-missile cruisers" in 1975.
full and by
Sailing into the wind (by), but not as close-hauled as might be possible, so as to make sure the sails are kept full. This provides a margin for error to avoid being taken aback in a tricky sea (a serious risk for square-rigged vessels). Figuratively it implies getting on with the job but in a steady, relaxed way, without undue urgency or strain.
full-rigged ship
A sailing vessel with three or more masts, all of them square-rigged. A full-rigged ship is said to have a "ship rig".
full steam ahead
With as much speed as possible.
funnel
1. (funnel) Also stack. The smokestack of a ship, used to expel boiler steam and smoke or engine exhaust.
2. Ventilation funnel: A curved, rotatable tube protruding from the deck of a vessel, designed to direct fresh air into her interior.
Furious Fifties
Strong westerly winds found in the Southern Hemisphere, generally between the latitudes of 50 and 60 degrees. They are stronger than the similar "Roaring Forties" to their north.
furl
To roll or gather a sail against its mast or spar.
furnace
Boiler component where fuel is burned.
furring
A method of improving the stability of a wooden vessel by increasing the breadth of the hull. The planking is removed and pieces of wood are added to the outside of the frames. Then the planking is replaced. An increase in breadth of about 1 foot (300 mm) could typically be achieved on each side. This was a common remedial technique at a time before shipwrights were able to carry out mathematical stability calculations.
fusta

A narrow, light, and fast ship with a shallow draft, powered both by oars and sail, with a single mast carrying a lateen sail; a favorite of North African corsairs during the 16th and 17th centuries.
futtock shrouds
Rope, wire, or chain links in the rigging of a traditional square-rigged ship running from the outer edges of a top downwards and inwards to a point on the mast or lower shrouds. They carry the load of the shrouds that rise from the edge of the top, preventing the top from tilting relative to the mast.
futtock
The part of a ship's frame that continues the structure above the floors. These often exist as individual pieces termed first futtock, second futtock and third futtock, numbered moving away from the keel. See also floating futtock

Contents: Top	A	B	C	D	E	F	G	H	I	J	K	L	M	N	O	P	Q	R	S	T	U	V	W	X	Y	Z	See also	References

== G ==
gabbart
The typical Scottish sailing barge or lighter of the 17th through 19th centuries, used mainly on inland waterways and especially on the River Clyde. A gabbart was a long, narrow, flat, single-masted vessel with a hatchway that extendied almost the full length of her deck, and some gabbarts had a mast that could be lowered to allow them to pass under bridges. Most later Scottish canal craft had their design origins in that of the gabbart.
gaff
1. (gaff rig) A spar that holds the upper edge of a four-sided fore-and-aft-mounted sail. On a hoisting gaff, the lower end is supported by gaff jaws which partly encircle the mast; it is hoisted using peak and throat halliards. A standing gaff remains aloft, its sails brailed when not in use.
2. (fishing gaff) A hook on a long pole used to haul in fish.
gaff rig
A boat rigged with a four-sided fore-and-aft sail set abaft the mast, its head being spread by a gaff. The gaff may be standing (permanently in position) with the sail being brailed up to the gaff when not in use, or, more commonly, is hoisted using two halliards: the peak and the throat.
gaff topsail
A fore-and-aft sail set above a gaff-rigged sail, with the clew sheeted to the end of the gaff.
gaff vang
A line rigged to the end of a gaff and used to adjust a gaff sail's trim.
gale
gali

galiot

1. Also foist and fuste, a narrow, light, and fast ship with a shallow draft, powered both by oars and sail, with a single mast carrying a lateen sail; a favorite of North African corsairs during the 16th and 17th centuries.
2. A type of Dutch or German merchant ship of the 17th through 19th centuries, similar to a ketch, with a rounded bow and stern like a fluyt and a nearly flat bottom, used especially for coastal navigation in the North Sea and Baltic Sea. Modernized after 1830 with a sharper bow similar to a schooner.
3. Also galiote, a type of French warship of the 17th through 19th centuries with one or two masts, lateen sails, and a bank of oars. When built with only one mast, little more than a large chaloupe or launch. A galiote a bombes was a galiote armed with a mortar for use in bombarding the coast.
4. Also galiote, a horse-drawn barge used on canals and rivers in France from the mid-17th century through the 19th century.
5. Also galiote or scute, a flat-bottomed boat with a simple sail used to transport wine in the Anjou region of France.
galleass
1. An oared warship of the 16th century equipped with a gun deck; larger and equipped with more sails than a galley.
2. A flat-bottomed commercial sailing vessel of the North Sea and western Baltic Sea.
galleon

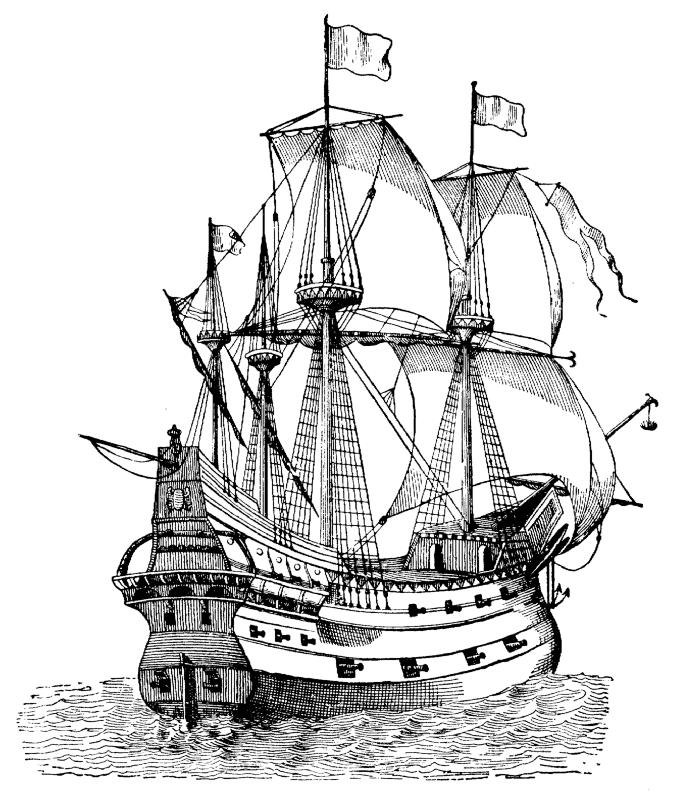
Illustration of a typical 16th century galleon

A large, multi-decked sailing ship with a prominent, squared-off, raised stern, generally carrying three or more masts, typically lateen fore-and-aft-rigged on the rear mast and square-rigged on the mainmast and foremast. Galleons were used primarily as armed cargo carriers and sometimes as warships by European states from the 16th to the 18th centuries.
galley
1. (galley (kitchen)) The compartment of a ship where food is cooked or prepared; a ship's kitchen.
2. (galley) A type of ship propelled by oars, used especially in the Mediterranean for warfare, piracy, and trade from the 8th century BC to the 16th century AD, with some in use until the early 19th century.
3. A type of oared gunboat built by the United States in the late 18th century, akin to a brigantine but termed "galley" for administrative and funding purposes.
galliot

gam
A meeting of two (or more) whaling ships at sea. The ships each send out a boat to the other, and the two captains meet on one ship, while the two chief mates meet on the other.
gammon iron
The bow fitting that clamps the bowsprit to the stem.
gangplank

A movable bridge used in boarding or leaving a ship at a pier.
gangway
An opening in the bulwark of a ship to allow passengers to board or leave the ship.
gantline
A rope running through a block at or near the masthead, with both ends reaching the deck. It is used solely for hoisting and lowering crew members and/or tools into the rigging for maintenance and repair work.
garbling
The illegal practice of mixing cargo with garbage.
garboard
The strake closest to the keel (from Dutch gaarboard).
garboard planks
The planks immediately on either side of the keel.
garland
A frame of wood or rope for holding shot, usually attached to a coaming or ledge on a ship's deck.
gash
Any refuse or rubbish discarded into a refuse container or dustbin, also known as "gash fanny" (South African Navy).
gasket (sailing)
A rope used to secure a sail (particularly the topsail) when stowed.
gate ship
An alternative term for a net-laying ship.
gear
A collective term for a vessel's sails and rigging.
geedunk
Ice cream, snacks, etc. Also the place selling such items.
general quarters

gennaker
A large, lightweight sail used for sailing a fore-and-aft rig down or across the wind, intermediate between a genoa and a spinnaker.
genoa

A large jib, strongly overlapping the mainmast.
ghali

Any of several types of galley-like ships from the Nusantara archipelago in Southeast Asia. The term refers both to Mediterranean vessels built by local people and to native vessels with Mediterranean influence.
ghost
To sail slowly when there is apparently no wind.
ghost fleet
In the modern United States, an informal term for a reserve fleet.
gibe

gig
A type of open boat designed primarily for propulsion under oar, but often fitted with a sailing rig for appropriate conditions. Used most often for the swift transport of one or a few people, as in a pilot gig or as a naval ship's boat. In US Navy usage, a captain's gig is reserved for use by a ship's captain and, in modern times, is a power-boat.
gig boat
An alternative term for a flyboat, a high-speed canal boat operating in England in the 1830s and 1840s.
gillnetter
A fishing vessel that employs gillnetting as its means of catching fish.
gin-pole

A pole that is attached perpendicular to a mast, to be used as a lever for raising the mast.
girt
1. Said of a vessel moored by cables to two anchors in such a way that the force of a current or tide causes her to swing against one of the cables.
2. To capsize because of forces exerted on a cable by another vessel attached to it. Tug girting specifically refers to girting that causes a tugboat to capsize because of forces placed on a cable attached to her by another vessel attached to the same cable.
give-way
In a situation where two vessels are approaching one another so as to involve a risk of collision, the vessel directed to keep out of the way of the other.
glass
1. A marine barometer. Older barometers used mercury-filled glass tubes to measure and indicate barometric pressure.
2. A marine sandglass.
Global Positioning System (GPS)
A satellite-based radionavigation system providing continuous worldwide coverage of geolocation and time information to air, marine, and land users wherever there is an unobstructed line of sight to at least four GPS satellites developed and operated by the United States Department of Defense but publicly available for use by anyone with an enabled GPS receiver.
go-fast boat
A small, fast boat designed with a long narrow platform and a planing hull to enable it to reach high speeds. Colloquially equivalent to a "rum-runner" or a "cigarette boat".
goat locker
A mess hall reserved for chief petty officers in the United States Navy.
going about
Changing from one tack to another by going through the wind. See also gybe.
gondola
1. A traditional, flat-bottomed Venetian rowing boat.
2. An alternative term for a gundalow.
gooseneck
A fitting that attaches a boom to a mast yet allows it to move freely.
goosewinged
(of a fore-and-aft-rigged vessel) Sailing directly away from the wind, with the sails set on opposite sides of the vessel (e.g. with the mainsail to port and the jib to starboard) so as to maximize the amount of canvas exposed to the wind. See also running.
Gozo boat
A type of settee-rigged sailing vessel used as the main means of transportation across the Gozo Channel between Gozo and the island of Malta in Malta beginning in the 1880s. Gozo boats were converted into fishing vessels or abandoned during the 1960s and 1970s, when steamships replaced them.
GPS

grapeshot
Small balls of lead fired from a cannon, analogous to shotgun shot but on a larger scale; similar to canister shot but with larger individual shot. Intended specifically to injure personnel and damage rigging more than to cause structural damage.
grave
To clean a ship's bottom.
graving dock
A narrow basin, usually made of earthen berms and concrete, closed by gates or by a caisson, into which a vessel may be floated and the water pumped out, leaving the vessel supported on blocks; the classic form of drydock.
graybeard

great-circle navigation
The practice of navigating a vessel along the arc of a great circle. Such routes yield the shortest possible distance between any given pair of points on the surface of the Earth.
green-to-green
A passage of two vessels moving in the opposite direction on their starboard sides, so called because the green navigation light on one of the vessels faces the green light on the other vessel.
Greenlandman
A British term used in the 18th and 19th centuries for any whaling ship operating in the Arctic Ocean or northern waters near the Arctic.
green water
1. That portion of the ocean lying generally within a few hundred nautical miles of shore but beyond the edge of the continental shelf, and thus between "brown water" over the continental shelf and "blue water" farther out to sea.
2. A large amount of water on or passing over or across a ship's deck or superstructure after a large wave strikes her, e.g., The ship took green water over her bow during the storm.
green-water navy
A navy capable of sustained operations beyond coastal areas out to a few hundred nautical miles from shore, i.e., in "green water," but not farther into the open ocean, i.e., in "blue water." While a green-water navy can possess ships capable of operating farther out to sea than in "green water," it requires logistical support from foreign countries to sustain such longer-range operations.
gridiron
A large metal cross-frame on which vessels are placed at high water for examination, cleaning, and repairs after the tide falls.
gripe
A temporary eye in a line (rope).
griping
The tendency of a ship to turn into the wind despite the efforts of the helmsman, usually due to either the design of a ship or more commonly the incorrect distribution of weight on and within the hull.
gripie
A Cockney (London dialect) name for a barge.
grog
Watered-down pusser's rum consisting of half a gill with an equal part of water, issued to all seamen over twenty (CPOs and POs were issued with neat rum). From the British Admiral Vernon who, in 1740, ordered the men's ration of rum to be watered down. He was called "Old Grogram" because he often wore a grogram coat, and the watered rum came to be called grog. Specific quantities of grog were often traded illegally as a form of currency; a sailor might repay a colleague for a favour by giving him part or all of his grog ration, ranging from "sippers" (a small amount) via "gulpers" (a larger quantity) to "grounders" (the entire tot). Additional issues of grog were made on the command "splice the mainbrace" for celebrations or as a reward for performing especially onerous duties. The Royal Navy discontinued the practice of issuing rum in 1970.
groggy
Drunk from having consumed a lot of grog.
grommet
1. A metal or plastic ring inserted in canvas to prevent wear.
2. A ring of rope.
3. An inexperienced surfer or extreme sports participant.
ground
The bed of the sea; the underwater surface or sea floor to which an anchor holds.
grounding
When a ship (while afloat) touches the bed of the sea, or runs aground. A moored vessel that grounds as the tide goes out is said to "take the ground".
groundway

A substantial foundation of wood or stone for the blocks on which a vessel is built, typically lying on either side of the keel of a ship under construction, which also serves to support and guide the blocks when they slide to carry the vessel into the water when she is launched.
growler
A small iceberg or ice floe barely visible above the surface of the water.
Guineaman
Another name for a slave ship, coined after the emergence of the transatlantic slave trade from Africa in the 15th century.
guards

1. (on an oceangoing sidewheel steamship) Horizontal structures, usually of wood, built around the paddle boxes just above their lowest point and extending a short distance forward and aft, designed to protect them from damage and to provide additional support for the paddle shaft.
2. (on an American sidewheel steamboat) Extensions of the main deck beyond the hull to the outer extremity of the paddle boxes, and tapering to the bow and stern (thus giving the deck a characteristic oval shape), to increase the available deck space for passengers, cargo, and/or machinery.
guard ship
1. Any vessel that makes the rounds of a fleet at anchor to see that due watch is kept at night.
2. A warship stationed at a port or harbour to act as a guard there.
3. In former times in the British Royal Navy, a ship that received men impressed for naval service, often the flagship of the admiral commanding along the coast.
4. In Soviet and Russian terminology, a guard ship (storozhevoj korabl') is a small, general-purpose patrol or escort vessel.
gun deck
1. Up through the 19th century, a deck aboard a ship that was primarily used for the mounting of cannon to be fired in broadsides.
2. On smaller vessels (of frigate size or smaller) up through the 19th century, the completely covered level under the upper deck, though in such smaller ships it carried none of the ship's guns.
3. On marine seismic survey vessels, the lowest deck on the ship, which carries the seismic source arrays, consisting of air guns arranged in clusters.
4. In naval slang, to fabricate or falsify something; in modern usage, meaning especially to falsify documentation in order to avoid doing work or make present conditions seem acceptable without having made a real effort to improve them.
gundecking
Falsifying of records and reports.
gundalow
A type of flat-bottomed sailing barge with a single large lateen sail brailed to a heavy yard, used on rivers in Maine and New Hampshire from the mid-17th century to the early 20th century. Sometimes referred to as a gondola in period accounts.
gunner's daughter

gunport
An opening in the side of a ship or in a turret through which a gun fires or protrudes.
gunroom
In a sailing vessel, the compartment in the stern in which stern chasers were mounted. This is also where the tiller enters through a tiller port, and so either the lower end of the whipstaff or the steering ropes that run to the wheel are present. In later ships, a mess in a warship used by sub-lieutenants, midshipmen and cadets.
gunter rig

A fore-and-aft sail set abaft (behind) the mast, approximately triangular in shape, with the top half of the luff (front) of the sail attached to a yard which extends the sail above the top of the mast. The yard is raised and lowered with the sail. This traditional sail is popular in small boats and produces aerodynamic performance close to that of the highly developed Bermuda rig.
gunwale

Generally, the upper edge of the hull; more specifically, in an open (undecked) boat of timber construction, the longitudinal stringer that connects the top of the ribs.
gurdy
A mechanical crank used to set and retrieve fishing lines.
guy
1. A rope or stay leading to the side of the vessel.
2. A rope used to steady a boom.
gybe

To change from one tack to the other away from the wind, with the stern of the vessel turning through the wind. See also going about and wearing ship.
gypsy winch
A type or component of an anchor winch. The "gypsy" or "gypsy wheel" engages the anchor chain.

Contents: Top	A	B	C	D	E	F	G	H	I	J	K	L	M	N	O	P	Q	R	S	T	U	V	W	X	Y	Z	See also	References

== H ==
half-breadth plan
In shipbuilding, an elevation of the lines of a ship, viewed from above and divided lengthwise.
halyard

Originally, ropes used for hoisting a spar with a sail attached; today, a line used to raise the head of any sail.
hammock
Canvas sheets, slung from the deckhead in messdecks, in which seamen slept. "Lash up and stow" was a piped command to tie up hammocks and stow them (typically) in racks inboard of the ship's side so as to protect the crew from splinters from shot and provide a ready means of preventing flooding caused by damage.
hamper
Articles that normally are indispensable aboard ship but at certain times are in the way.
hand
To lower or furl a sail.
hand bomber
A ship using coal-fired boilers shoveled in by hand.
hand over fist
To climb steadily upwards, from the motion of a sailor climbing shrouds on a sailing ship (originally "hand over hand").
handsomely
With a slow even motion, as when hauling on a line "handsomely".
handy billy
A loose block and tackle with a hook or tail on each end, which can be used wherever it is needed. Usually made up of one single and one double block.
hangar deck
An enclosed deck on an aircraft carrier, usually beneath the flight deck and intended for use as a hangar in servicing and storing aircraft.
hank
A fastener attached to the luff of the headsail that attaches the headsail to the forestay. Typical designs include a bronze or plastic hook with a spring-operated gate, or a strip of cloth webbing with a snap fastener.
harbor of refuge American English
harbour of refuge British English
An artificial harbour constructed on a coast without a natural harbour to provide shelter for small vessels.
harbor American English
harbour British English

A place where ships or smaller craft may shelter from the weather, are unloaded/loaded, or stored. Harbours can be man-made or natural.
harbor dues American English
harbour dues British English
The fees charged by the owners or operators of a harbour to those vessels using the harbour. Under British legislation, the person in charge of a vessel must report to the harbourmaster within 24 hours of arrival in a port where harbour dues are payable.
harbormaster American English
harbourmaster British English
A person in charge of a harbour, with powers including the collection of the harbour dues, instructing the masters of vessels where to moor, and overall safety within the area of the harbour, often including pilotage and navigational aids. In most countries the powers of a harbour master are laid down by legislation, and can be quite extensive.
hard
A section of otherwise muddy shoreline suitable for mooring or hauling out.
hard-a-lee

harden in
To haul in the sheet and tighten the sails.
harden up
To turn towards the wind; to sail closer to the wind.
harness cask

A large, usually round tub lashed to a vessel's deck and containing dried and salted provisions for daily use.
hardtack
A hard and long-lasting dry biscuit, used as food on long journeys. Also called a "ship's biscuit".
hatch
hatchway
A covered opening in a ship's deck through which cargo can be loaded or access made to a lower deck; the cover to the opening is called a hatch.
haul
1. To steer (a vessel) closer to the direction of the wind.
2. To shift forward, i.e. more toward the bow of the vessel.
hauling wind
Pointing the ship towards the direction of the wind; generally not the fastest point of travel on a sailing vessel.
hawsepipe

The shaft or hole in the side of a vessel's bow through which the anchor chain passes. "In through the hawsepipe" describes someone with experience and savvy.
hawsepiper
An informal term for an officer of a merchant ship who began their career as an unlicensed merchant seaman, and so did not attend a traditional maritime academy to earn their officer's licence. See also before the mast.
hawser
A large cable or rope used for mooring or towing a vessel.
head
1. The forwardmost or uppermost portion of the ship.
2. The forwardmost or uppermost portion of any individual part of the ship, e.g. masthead, beakhead, stemhead, etc.
3. The top edge of a sail.
4. The toilet or latrine of a vessel, which in sailing ships usually projected from the bow and therefore was located in the "head" of the vessel.
head boat
A fishing boat that takes recreational fishermen out for a fee paid individually by each person (i.e. per head). A head boat differs from a charter boat, which is a fishing boat that a party of fishermen hires for an agreed-upon period.
Head of navigation
The farthest point above the mouth of a river that can be navigated by ships.
head rail
A curved rail that extends from the figurehead to the bow of a ship.
head rope
1. The mooring rope that goes from the bow of a vessel to a point on a jetty a distance ahead of the bows.
2. Part of the bolt rope, at the head of a sail, running from the mast to the sprit.
head sea
A sea in which waves are directly opposing the motion of the ship, or approaching within 15° of ahead.
head-sail
1. Jibs and staysails set between the bowsprit and the fore
2. Sometimes refers to the square sails on the fore-mast of a square rigged vessel.
head-stays
Stays between the bowsprit and the foremost mast.
header
A change in the wind direction that forces the helmsman of a close-hauled sailboat to steer away from its current course to a less favorable one. This is the opposite of a lift.
heading
The direction in which the nose of a vessel is pointing (which is not necessarily the same as the direction in which the vessel is actually moving).
headsail
Any sail set in front of the most forward mast. A sailing vessel may have one or more headsails. A headsail may be hanked to a stay, or may be set flying, with the luff being kept taut by the tension of the halyard. Where several headsails are set, a complex arrangement might be termed (from the front and top) flying jib, outer jib, inner jib, and (fore) staysail; less complex would be jib and staysail
headstick
The spar laced to the head of the topsail.
heave
A vessel's transient, vertical, up-and-down motion.
heave down
To turn a ship on its side (for cleaning), a process which is also known as careening.
heave ho!
An exclamation sailors make when pulling forcefully on a rope.
heave to

heavy weather
A combination of high winds and rough seas that may be dangerous for a ship or boat, sometimes requiring changes to a passage plan (such as a precautionary diversion to a safe harbour), heaving to, running under bare poles, or other similar survival strategies.
heel
1. The lean caused by the wind's force on the sails of a sailing vessel.
2. The inclination or canting of a vessel to one side or the other from the vertical as she maneuvers, e.g. "The ship heeled to port as she turned to starboard".
3. The lowest or last part of something, such as the heel of the mast or the heel of the vessel.
helicopter deck
A helicopter pad on the deck of a ship. In the United States Navy, a helicopter deck is referred to as a flight deck.
helm
1. A ship's steering mechanism, such as a tiller or ship's wheel.
2. The wheel and/or wheelhouse area.
3. (v.) To take over the steering of a vessel.
helmsman

A member of the crew who is responsible for steering the ship.
herring buss
A type of seagoing fishing vessel used by Dutch and Flemish herring fishermen from the 15th through the early 19th century.
highfield lever
A type of tensioning lever, usually for running backstays. Their use allows the leeward backstay to be completely slackened so that the boom can be let fully out.
hitch
A knot used to tie a rope or line to a fixed object. See also bend.
hobby horsing
Harmonic pitching of a vessel forward and backward.
hog
1. A fore-and-aft structural member of the hull fitted over the keel to provide a fixing for the garboard planks.
2. A rough, flat scrubbing brush for cleaning a ship's bottom under water.
3. A semi-permanent bend in a ship's keel, especially in wooden-hulled ships, caused over time by the ship's center being more buoyant than her bow or stern.
hog frame
A heavy wooden truss fitted lengthwise along each side of a large American steamboat, secured to the hull and rising above deck just outside the superstructure, to provide support for the hull and prevent hogging. Similar in appearance and function to a truss bridge. See also king post.
Hog Islander
Slang term used for Design 1022 cargo ships and Design 1024 troop transports constructed at Hog Island in Philadelphia, Pennsylvania, to address merchant marine shortfalls in the United States during World War I. Completed too late for World War I, Hog Islanders saw United States Navy and United States Merchant Marine service prior to and during World War II.
hogging
1. A condition in which the hull of a vessel bends upward such that the ends of the keel are lower than the middle. Hogging can occur when the peak of a wave is amidships or during loading or unloading of a vessel and can damage her or even break her in half. Contrast sagging.
2. A permanent distortion of the hull in the same manner as above, caused over time by the bow and stern of a ship being less buoyant than the midships section. During the Age of Sail, shipwrights employed a number of different designs of braces to stiffen ships' hulls against this warping.
hogging line
A line passed under a ship from side to side to pull a collision mat into place over a leak. Also a line passed under a ship from side to side used as a reference to indicate position of a frame during underwater inspections.
hoist
The height of a fore-and-aft-rigged sail as measured next to the mast or stay.
hold
The lower part of the interior of a ship's hull, especially when considered as storage space, as for cargo. In earlier use, the term referred to all interior spaces below the orlop deck; in later merchant vessels it extended up through the decks to the underside of the weather deck.
holiday
A gap in the coverage of newly applied paint, slush, tar, or another preservative.
holystone
A chunk of sandstone used to scrub a ship's decks. The name comes from both the kneeling position sailors adopt to scrub the deck (reminiscent of genuflection for prayer), and the stone itself (which resembled a Bible in shape and size).
home port
The port at which a vessel is based. Often confused with the ship's port of registry, which is the port listed in the vessel's registration documents and lettered on her stern but which may differ from her home port. In the cruise ship industry, the term "home port" is often incorrectly used to refer to a ship's port of departure.
homeward bounder
A slang term for a sail repair, especially one done with large herringbone stitches.
honey barge
Slang term for a vessel that transports sewage.
hoop
Wooden or metal hoops used to secure the topsail to the topmast so it can be speedily raised or lowered.
horn
A sound signal that uses electricity or compressed air to vibrate a disc diaphragm.
hornpipe
A type of dance.
horns
Shaped ends to the chocks where the main horse is bolted.
horn timber
A fore-and-aft structural member of the hull sloping up and backwards from the keel to support the counter.
horse
1. A metal bar (sometimes a shaped aluminium extrusion), running athwartships, to which a sheet is attached with a traveller that slides along the horse or is adjusted to be fixed in one position on it. Commonly used for a mainsheet, but also seen with some headsails, particularly a staysail fitted with a boom.
2. Sand lying mid-channel.
3. (verb) To move or adjust a sail by manual force (i.e. directly with the hands) rather than by using running rigging.
4. (verb) A term used since the end of the 17th century for the action of a strong, favorable current on a sailing vessel allowing her to make good progress despite insufficient wind for sailing; the vessel is considered to be horsed by the current, riding it in the way a human rides a horse.
horse latitudes
The latitudes between 30 and 35 degrees in the Northern Hemisphere and between 30 and 35 degrees in the Southern Hemisphere in which weather patterns often result in sailing vessels being becalmed in mid-ocean.
hospital ship
A ship designated and equipped to serve primarily as a floating medical healthcare facility or hospital, usually operated by military forces such as navies for use in or near war zones, or for the support of disaster relief and other humanitarian operations.
hounds
Attachments point of stays to masts.
hotel load
The electrical load for all non-propulsion systems on a ship, including lighting, climate control, and services used by the crew and passengers.
hove to
1. In a sailing vessel, stopping her by backing some of the sails and lashing the helm to leeward. In a fore-and-aft-rigged sloop, this involves backing the headsail and allowing the mainsail to fill somewhat (the precise arrangement varies from one vessel to another). The vessel will gradually drift to leeward, with the speed of the drift depending on the vessel's design.
2. In a powered vessel, stopping her by stopping her engines.
hoveller
1. Someone who does salvage work, such as that done by Deal boatmen.
2. An additional crewman who assists getting a vessel in and out of harbour. See also huffler (regional usage of these words varies substantially, with strongly held views on the differences).
how's your head?
A question asked of the helmsman to report the vessel's course at that moment. The actual course may differ from the course to steer that has been ordered.
hoy
1. A cutter-rigged craft, having a pole masted with a boomless gaff mainsail and a steeved-up bowsprit. Hoys were square, swim-headed Thames estuary barges of 40 to 150 tons burthen.
2. A barge making regular passages on a fixed route with mixed third-party cargoes. Also passage barge or goods barge.
hufflers
Additional crew taken on to enter harbour or navigate in confined waters, particularly applying to Thames barges. See also hoveller.
hulk
Hulk: A ship, often an old ship or one that has become obsolete or uneconomical to operate, that has had its rigging or internal equipment removed and is incapable of going to sea, but that is still afloat and continues to serve a useful function, such as providing living, office, training, storage, or prison space..
2. (v.) To convert a ship into a hulk.
3. A ship that has been launched but not completed.
4. An abandoned wreck or shell of a ship.
5. Hulk, also holk: A type of medieval ship of Europe which apparently originated as a river vessel in the Low Countries sometime prior to 1000. A hulk had a forecastle, an aftercastle, and a single mast amidships with a square sail. Hulks apparently were employed as cargo ships by England and the Hanseatic League, although some may have operated as warships. The caravel replaced the hulk in the 15th century.
hull
The shell and framework of the basic flotation-oriented part of a ship.
hull speed
The maximum efficient speed of a displacement-hulled vessel.
hull-down
Of a vessel when only her upper parts (e.g. funnel, masts, and superstructure) are visible on the horizon but her hull remains below the horizon. Contrast hull-up.
hull-up
Of a vessel when her hull as well as her upper parts (e.g., funnel, masts, and superstructure) are visible on the horizon. Contrast hull-down.
hydrofoil
A boat with wing-like foils mounted on struts below the hull, lifting the hull entirely out of the water at speed and therefore greatly reducing water resistance.
hydroplane

A fast motorboat with a hull shaped so that at speed planing forces support the boat's weight, rather than simple buoyancy. A hydroplane moving at speed thus relies on the water for lift instead of buoyancy.

Contents: Top	A	B	C	D	E	F	G	H	I	J	K	L	M	N	O	P	Q	R	S	T	U	V	W	X	Y	Z	See also	References

- I

ice class
A notation assigned by a ship classification society or a national government authority to denote a ship's level of strengthening and other arrangements enabling her to navigate through sea ice. In some cases, an ice class also establishes the performance requirements for a vessel operating in sea ice.
icebreaker
A special-purpose ship or boat designed to move and navigate through ice-covered waters.
icing
A serious hazard where cold temperatures — below about −10 °C (14 °F) — combined with high wind speed (typically force 8 or above on the Beaufort scale) result in spray blown off the sea freezing immediately upon contact with the ship. If the weight of the ice becomes too great, the ship will become top-heavy and capsize.
idlers
Members of a ship's company not required to serve watches. In general, these were specialist tradesmen such as the carpenter and the sailmaker.
in ballast

(of a vessel) Having only ballast, and no cargo, as a load.
in irons

When a sailing vessel has lost all power in its sails along with all of its forward momentum preventing the vessel from steering. In high enough wind, backwards momentum can be reached from the wind pushing the vessel backwards.
in ordinary
An 18th- and 19th-century term originally used to refer to a naval vessel that is out of service for repair or maintenance, later coming to mean naval ships in reserve with no more than a caretaker crew.
in the way
Humorous slang for when a crew's sole role on a sailboat, typically on a racing vessel, is to be used as a human ballast, or more commonly referred to as railmeat by sailors, by sitting on the rail or edge of the vessel to balance the weight.
in-water survey
A method of surveying the underwater parts of a ship while it is still afloat instead of having to drydock it for examination of these areas as was conventionally done.
in way of
In the vicinity of; in the area of.
inboard
1. Situated within a vessel.
2. Situated within a vessel and positioned close (or closer relative to another object) to her centerline.
3. Situated outside a vessel but nearer to her hull, e.g. "The larger boat was tied up alongside the ship inboard of the smaller boat."
4. Nearer the pier or shore, e.g. "The tanker and cargo ship were tied up at the pier alongside one another with the tanker inboard of the cargo ship."
inboard motor
An engine mounted within the hull of a vessel, usually driving a fixed propeller by a shaft protruding through the stern. Generally used on larger vessels. See also sterndrive and outboard motor.
inboard-outboard drive system

Inglefield clip
A type of clip for attaching a flag to a flag halyard.
inshore
1. Near (especially in sight of) or toward the shore.
2. (of a wind) Blowing from the sea to the land.
interloper
A term used by the British East India Company in the seventeenth century for a merchant ship operating in violation of the company's monopoly over trade between England (later the United Kingdom) and ports east of the Cape of Good Hope. If caught, an "interloper" and her cargo could be confiscated, and her crew faced harsh penalties.
invoke
To signal another ship.
Iron Mike
A slang term for autopilot.
iron topsail
An auxiliary motor on a schooner.
iron wind
What sailors call inboard engines.
ironboat

A Great Lakes term for a vessel primarily used in the transport of iron ore.
ironclad
A steam-propelled warship protected by iron or steel armor plates of the period from 1859 until the 1890s (when the term "ironclad" fell out of use).
island
The superstructure of an aircraft carrier that extends above the flight deck. A carrier that lacks one is said to be flush-decked.

Contents: Top	A	B	C	D	E	F	G	H	I	J	K	L	M	N	O	P	Q	R	S	T	U	V	W	X	Y	Z	See also	References

== J ==
jack
1. Also jack tar or just tar. A sailor.
2. (jack (flag)) A national or other official flag flown on a short jackstaff at the bow of a vessel indicating nationality or subordination to a navy or other particular seagoing service or to a government department or subnational government (such as a state or province), or to indicate membership in a yacht club. Typically, crew members spoke of the jack as if it were a member of the crew. A jack contrasts with an ensign, which is a flag with a generally similar purpose flown from the vessel's stern. Typically, vessels fly a jack while in port and an ensign while at sea (in daylight hours).
3. Informally, any flag flown by a ship.
jackass-barque

A sailing ship with three or more masts, of which the foremast is square-rigged and the main is partially square-rigged (topsail, topgallant, etc.) and partially fore-and-aft-rigged (course). The mizzen mast is fore-and-aft-rigged.
jack dusty
A naval stores clerk.
jack tar
A sailor dressed in "square rig" with square collar. Formerly with a tarred pigtail.
jackline
On a yacht, a deck lifeline of rope or (preferably) flat tape, running fore and aft, to which the crew can clip their harnesses for safety. Sometimes called a jackstay, though this is a misnomer as a jackline is a line rather than a stay. The line must be very strong to take the weight of all crew clipped to it.
jackstaff
A small vertical pole on the bow of a vessel upon which is flown its flag, or jack. The jackstaff was introduced in the 18th century.
jackstay
1. A rope, bar, or batten running along a ship's yard, to which is attached the head of a square sail.
2. A stay for racing or cruising vessels used to steady the mast against the strain of the gaff.
3. A cable between two ships or from a ship to a fixed point that supports a load during transfer of personnel or materiel along the cable.
4. On a yacht, a deck lifeline of rope or (preferably) flat tape may be called a jackstay, though this is a misnomer as a jackstay is a stay rather than a line.
Jacob's ladder

1. A flexible hanging ladder consisting of vertical ropes or chains supporting horizontal rungs, used to allow access over the side of a ship, either to transfer between the ship and another vessel alongside it or to perform maintenance tasks along the side of the ship. Sometimes mistakenly referred to as a pilot ladder, which differs from a Jacob's ladder in its use of spreaders and in terms of specific regulations governing step size and step spacing.
2. A vertical ladder from the ratlines found on square-rigged ships, used to get around the top while climbing between the lower mast and the topmast.
jetty
A man-made pier in a marina or open water, typically made of wood or rocks and rising several feet above high tide in order to create a breakwater, shelter, pr channel, to control erosion, or to perform another function.
jetsam
Floating debris ejected from a ship. See also flotsam.
jib
A triangular headsail at the front of a sailing vessel. The tack is attached to the bow or to a bowsprit. May be the only headsail, or one of several – in which case the jib is set forward of the fore staysail. A large jib that overlaps the mainmast is called a genoa or genny.
jib top
A high-clewed overlapping headsail for beam reaching in medium to strong winds
jibboom
A spar used to extend the bowsprit.
jibe

jibe-ho

jigger-mast
The fourth mast on a ship, or the aftmost mast where it is smallest on vessels of less than four masts.
joggle
A slender, triangular recess cut into the faying surface of a frame or steamed timber to fit over the land of clinker planking, or cut into the faying edge of a plank or rebate to avoid feather ends on a strake of planking. The feather end is cut off to produce a nib. The joggle and nib in this case is made wide enough to allow a caulking iron to enter the seam.
jollies
Traditional Royal Navy nickname for the Royal Marines.
jolly boat
A type of ship's boat used to ferry crew and stores.
Jonah
A person (either a sailor or a passenger) who carries a jinx, one whose presence on board brings bad luck and endangers the ship.
Jonah's lift
The throwing overboard of a man considered to be a Jonah, almost always in the dark of night.
junk
1. Old cordage past its useful service life as lines aboard a ship. The strands of old junk were teased apart in a process known as "picking oakum".
2. A sailing ship of classic Chinese design with characteristic full batten sails that span the masts usually on unstayed rigs.
jury rig
Both the act of rigging a temporary mast and/or sails and the name of the resulting rig. A jury rig would be built at sea when the original rig was damaged, and then used to sail to a harbor or other safe place for permanent repairs. Also used as a general term for a temporary repair, hence "jury rudder", "jury tiller", etc.

Contents: Top	A	B	C	D	E	F	G	H	I	J	K	L	M	N	O	P	Q	R	S	T	U	V	W	X	Y	Z	See also	References

== K ==
kaep
A type of proa native to Palau.
K BO Line
A line or mark on the aft end of a ship indicating the true centerline of the transom.
kedge

A type of relatively light anchor.
kedging
A technique for moving or turning a ship by using a kedge. The kedge anchor may be dropped while in motion to create a pivot and thus perform a sharp turn. It may also be carried away from the ship in a smaller boat, dropped, and then weighed, pulling the ship forward.
keel
The principal central longitudinal structural member of a hull, positioned at or close to the lowest point of the hull. Where the keel protrudes below the surface of the hull, it provides hydrodynamic resistance to the lateral forces that give rise to leeway. A ballast keel of (typically) lead or cast iron may be fastened underneath the structural keel in sailing vessels to provide stability and usually also additional hydrodynamic lift and lateral resistance effects. See also bilge keel.
keel draft
keel draught
Depth of water occupied by the vessel from the waterline to the underside of the keel. Compare with moulded draught.
keelhauling
A type of maritime punishment by which one is dragged under the keel of a ship.
keelson

A baulk of timber or a steel girder immediately above the keel that forms the backbone of a wooden ship. A chine keelson of more modest proportions is fitted at the junction of the floors and frames.
kellet

kentledge
Weights, usually pig iron, used as permanent, high-density ballast.
ketch
A two-masted fore-and-aft-rigged sailboat with the aft mast (the mizzen) mounted (stepped) afore the rudder.
killick
1. A small anchor.
2. A seaman promoted to the first step of the promotion ladder in the British Royal Navy. A fouled anchor is the substantive badge of non-commissioned officers, signifying that the wearer is an able seaman skilled to cope with the awkward job of dealing with a fouled killick.
kicking strap
1. A rope, tackle, or hydraulic ram running from the mast at or just above deck level to a point partway along the boom of a yacht's mainsail or mizzen. Its function is to pull the boom down, flattening the sail in strong winds, reducing twist, and preventing the boom from kicking up when running.
2. A chain rigged from rudder to quarter that is tight at anchor, stopping the rudder from kicking and reducing pressure on its gudgeons.
king plank
The centerline plank of a laid deck. Its sides are often recessed, or nibbed, to take the ends of their parallel curved deck planks.
king post
1. On an American wooden-hulled steamboat, a type of mast or stanchion located along the vessel's centerline from which heavy chains (and later cables) were suspended to support the weight of the hull and provide stiffening, in much the same manner as the cables on a suspension bridge; usually used in conjunction with a hog frame.
2. On a cargo ship, a strong vertical post from which a derrick or boom is suspended.
Kingston valve
A type of seacock designed so that the water pressure from the sea keeps it closed under normal operating conditions, but can be opened from the inside of the ship, allowing seawater to enter internal fuel, water, or ballast tanks. Kingston valves can be opened to scuttle a ship.
kissing the gunner's daughter
Bending over the barrel of a gun for punitive beating with a cane or cat o' nine tails.
kitchen rudder
A hinged cowling around a fixed propeller, allowing the drive to be directed to the side or forwards in order to manoeuvre the vessel.
kite
A spinnaker.
knee
1. A structural element connecting two parts roughly at right angles, e.g. deck beams to frames.
2. A vertical rubber fender used on pushboats or piers, sometimes shaped like a human leg bent slightly at the knee.
knighthead
1. A mitred backing timber that extends the after line of the rabbet in the stem to give extra support to the ends of the planks and the bowsprit.
2. A bollard or bitt.
3. Either of two timbers rising from the keel of a sailing ship and supporting the inner end of the bowsprit.
knock

knockdown
The condition of a sailboat being pushed abruptly over on its side, i.e. to horizontal or "on its beam ends", with the masts parallel to the water surface.
knot
A unit of speed equivalent to 1 nautical mile (1.8520 km; 1.1508 mi) per hour. Originally the speed of a moving vessel was measured by paying out a line from the stern; the line was tied into a knot every 47 feet 3 inches (14.40 m), and the number of knots paid out in 30 seconds gave the speed through the water in nautical miles per hour. Sometimes "knots" is mistakenly stated as "knots per hour", but the latter is a measure of acceleration (i.e. "nautical miles per hour per hour") rather than of speed. Both vessel speed and wind speed are commonly reported in knots.
know the ropes
A sailor who knows the ropes can identify all the many ropes used in working a sailing vessel. On a square rigged ship, there would typically be more than 130 named ropes in the running rigging which are made fast at deck level – the majority of these are duplicated on both the port and starboard sides, so doubling that count. In order to know the ropes, a sailor must first learn the ropes. There were conventions with the positioning of all the many ropes belayed at deck level on a square-rigged ship, so a newly signed-on hand would quickly know where to find a particular rope on a strange ship.

Contents: Top	A	B	C	D	E	F	G	H	I	J	K	L	M	N	O	P	Q	R	S	T	U	V	W	X	Y	Z	See also	References

== L ==
lace
To attach a sail to a spar by passing a rope through eyelet holes and around the spar or its jackstay.
ladder
On board a ship, all "stairs" are called ladders, except for literal staircases aboard passenger ships. Most "stairs" on a ship are extremely narrow and nearly vertical, hence the name.
lagan
Cargo that has been thrown overboard, sunk to the seabed, and buoyed so it can be found later.
laid up
To be placed in reserve or mothballed. The latter usage in modern times refers to a specific set of procedures used by the United States Navy to preserve ships in good condition.
lake freighter
A bulk carrier that operates on the Great Lakes of North America.
lakeboat
laker
1. Great Lakes slang for a vessel that spends all of her time on any of the five Great Lakes.
2. A lake freighter.
lakeshoring

A Great Lakes term for the general cargo and passenger trade between settlements on the Great Lakes during the 19th and early 20th centuries. Lakeshoring usually was conducted by schooners of 50 to 60 feet (15 to 18 m) in length, sometimes referred to as lakeshoring schooners.
land lubber
A person unfamiliar with being on the sea or with the workings of a seafaring vessel.
landfall
1. Arrival at a coastline by ship.
2. In now-obsolete usage, the first land discovered after a sea voyage.
landmark
An object ashore that is visible from sea and sufficiently distinct such that it is marked on nautical charts for the purpose of fixing position while at sea.
landsman
A military rank for a naval recruit, used in the United Kingdom in the 18th century and the first half of the 19th century and in the United States in the 19th and early 20th centuries.
langrage
langridge
1. Another name for canister shot.
2. Solid shot suitable for damaging rigging.
lang's lay
Rope in which the lay of the strands is on the same hand as the lay of the constituents of the strands.
lanyard
A light rope that suspends a small item to prevent loss or is used to operate something by pulling on it.
larboard
An obsolete term for the left side of a ship. Derived from "lay-board", which provided access between a ship and a quay when ships normally docked with the left side to the wharf. Later replaced by "port side" or "port", to avoid confusion with starboard.
large

lateen sail

A triangular, sometimes quadrilateral, fore-and-aft sail set on a long yard mounted at an angle to the mast.
lateral system
A system of aids to navigation in which characteristics of buoys and beacons indicate the sides of the channel or route relative to a conventional direction of buoyage (usually upstream).
lattice mast

A type of observation mast constructed with a hyperboloid structure using an array of thin columns at angles, crossing each other in a double-helical spiral configuration. Lattice masts were most common aboard major United States Navy warships in the early 20th century, particularly on dreadnought battleships and armored cruisers; they were largely replaced by tripod masts during the 1920s and 1930s.
launch
1. The largest ship's boat carried by a warship – usually an open boat and, in more recent times, fitted with an engine. Historically, fitted both to be rowed or sailed.
2. In modern usage, a large motorboat; e.g., a harbourmaster's launch.
3. An elegant power boat of traditional character with a displacement hull; e.g., a slipper launch.
4. To dispatch a newly built ship down a slipway, usually with ceremony, prior to fitting-out and commissioning.
5. To put into the water any boat that is stored or temporarily kept out of the water; e.g., "launch the lifeboat" or "launch a dinghy".
lay
1. To come and go, used in giving orders to the crew, e.g., "lay forward" or "lay aloft", respectively indicating that the crew should move to the forward part of the ship or take up positions aloft.
2. To direct the course of a vessel.
3. (verb) To twist the strands of a rope together. (n) The direction of twist in cordage made from twisted strands
4. To travel in a direction which will reach or pass just upwind of a mark, buoy, or harbor, e.g., "We will lay the mark".
lay day
An unexpected delay time during a voyage often spent at anchor or in a harbor. It is usually caused by bad weather, equipment failure, or needed maintenance.
lay to

To bring a vessel into the wind and hold her stationary. A vessel doing this is said to be laying to.
laying down
Laying the keel of a ship in a shipyard, and thereby beginning her construction. The age of a ship is often indicated by giving the date it was laid down.
laytime
The amount of time stipulated in a voyage charter for a vessel to be loaded or unloaded. If a vessel is loaded or unloaded in less than the laytime, the shipowner may be required to pay despatch to the charter party. If the loading or unloading takes longer than the laytime, the charter party may be required to pay demurrage to the shipowner.
lazaret

1. A small stowage locker at the aft end of a boat.
2. A ship or building used for the quarantine of sick patients.
3. An area on some merchant ships where provisions are stored.
4. In modern shipbuilding and on powerboats of all sizes, the location of the steering gear equipment for the vessel.
lazy jacks
lazyjacks
A network of cordage rigged to a point on the mast and to a series of points on either side of the boom that cradles and guides the sail onto the boom when the sail is lowered.
lazy line

A line used for stern-to mooring attached to a floating pontoon or harbor wall which leads back to a seabed mooring.
LBP

leach

lead
1. A plummet or mass of lead attached to a line, used in sounding depth at sea.
2. In former usage, to estimate velocity in knots.
3. The path or route of a line (cordage).
4. Lead (sea ice): Large fracture in sea ice creating a navigable waterway.
lead ship

The first in a series or class of ships. The lead ship is usually, but not always, the first of her class to be completed and often, but not always, the class as a whole is known by her name. In the latter case, the lead ship is also the name ship of the class.
leadline

An instrument used in navigation to measure water depth; the line attached to a lead.
leadsman
A sailor who takes soundings with a lead, measuring the depth of the water.
league
A unit of length used to measure distances, normally equal to three nautical miles, but varies by nationality.
learn the ropes
To be trained in the identification and proper use of the many various ropes used on a sailing ship. An apprentice sailor, especially on a square-rigged ship, needs to know which rope of the many that are belayed at deck level does which job. A small square sail will have, at a minimum, two sheets, two clewlines, several buntlines, and two braces, and may also have a halyard. A single mast may have up to five square sails. To do his job, a sailor must be able to identify each rope from all the many options – and in the dark. Slacking or hauling the wrong one may not only be inefficient but also potentially dangerous. Once proficient in these tasks, a sailor is said to "know the ropes".
lee helm
The tendency of a sailboat to turn to leeward in a strong wind when there is no change in the rudder's position. This is the opposite of weather helm and is the result of a dynamically unbalanced condition. See also center of lateral resistance.
lee side

The side of a ship that is sheltered from the wind; i.e. the side that is downwind, or in the direction toward which the wind is blowing. Contrast weather side or windward.
lee shore
A shore downwind of a ship. A ship that cannot sail well to windward risks being blown onto a lee shore and grounded.
leeboard
A large fan-shaped wooden board or fin mounted in pairs on the side of a boat. They can be lowered on the lee side of the ship to reduce leeway (similarly to a centerboard on a dinghy).
leeboard irons
The iron bars that run from the mainmast case to the head of each leeboard, which they support.
leeboard pendant
A wire connecting the fan of the leeboard to a winch on the barges quarter. They control the fall of the leeboard.
leech

The aft or trailing edge of a fore-and-aft sail, the leeward edge of a spinnaker, or a vertical edge of a square sail. The leech is susceptible to twist, which is controlled by the boom vang, mainsheet, and, if rigged with one, the gaff vang.
lee-oh

A command to come about (tack through the wind) on a sailing boat. The response by the helmsman to indicate the order has been carried out, is "helm's alee"
leeward
(pronounced /ˈljuːərd/ in nautical use) In the direction toward which the wind is blowing. Contrast windward.
leeway
The amount that a ship is blown leeward by the wind. Also the amount of open free sailing space available to the lee side of a vessel before encountering hazards. See also weatherly.
leg
In navigation, a segment of a voyage between two waypoints.
length between perpendiculars

The length of a vessel along the waterline from the forward surface of the stem or main bow perpendicular member, to the after surface of the sternpost or main stern perpendicular member. The measure generally allows for a reasonable estimate of the vessel's carrying capacity, as it excludes the small, often unusable volume contained in her overhanging ends.
length overall (LOA)
The maximum length of a vessel's hull measured parallel to the waterline, usually measured on the hull alone, and including overhanging ends that extend beyond the main bow and main stern perpendicular members. For sailing vessels, this may exclude the bowsprit and other fittings added to the hull, but sometimes bowsprits are included.
let go and haul
An order indicating that the ship is now on the desired course relative to the wind and that the sails should be trimmed (hauled) to suit.
letter of marque
letter of marque and reprisal
An official warrant granted to a privateer condoning specific acts of piracy against a specific target as a redress for grievances.
liberty
A relatively short period when a sailor is allowed ashore for recreation. See also shore leave.
licensed ship
A term used by the British East India Company from the 17th to the 19th centuries for merchant ships not under charter to it which it nevertheless permitted under a license issued by the company to trade between England (later the United Kingdom) and ports east of the Cape of Good Hope, a trade over which the company otherwise held a strict monopoly. The company placed strict controls on what ports a licensed ship could visit and what kinds of trade it could engage in. A licensed ship that violated these rules became an interloper and faced harsh penalties if caught.
lie to
To arrange a ship's sails so that they counteract each other. A ship in this condition or in the process of achieving this condition is said to be lying to.
lifebelt

A portable or wearable device such as a buoyant ring or inflatable jacket designed to keep a person afloat in the water.
lifeboat
1. (shipboard lifeboat) A small boat kept on board a vessel and used to take crew and passengers to safety in the event of the ship being abandoned.
2. (rescue lifeboat) A small boat usually launched from shore and used to rescue people from the water or from vessels in difficulty.
liferaft
An inflatable, sometimes covered raft used in the event of a vessel being abandoned or in the evacuation of an aircraft after a water landing.
lift
1. A rope that supports a spar on a sailing vessel. Examples include the topping lift on the boom of a fore and aft rigged sail, or the lifts on the yard of a square rigged sail, which can adjust the yard to the horizontal or cock-bill the yard to get it out of the way when unloading cargo or alongside another vessel.
2. An enabling shift in the direction of the wind that allows a close-hauled sailing ship to point up from its current course to a more favorable one. This is the opposite of a header.
light irons
Iron bars mounted near the main shrouds that support the navigation lights.
light screens
Boards on which the navigation lights are hooked and which shield the direction that the red or green light shows.
lighter
A flat-bottomed barge used to transfer goods and passengers to and from moored ships, traditionally unpowered and moved and steered using "sweeps" (long oars), with their motive power provided by water currents.
lightering
The process of transferring cargo from one vessel to another in order to reduce the draft of the first vessel, typically done to allow a vessel to enter a port with limited depth or to help free a grounded vessel.
lightship
lightvessel
A permanently anchored vessel performing the functions of a lighthouse, typically in a location where construction of the latter is impractical. These have largely been replaced by buoys or, as construction techniques have improved, actual lighthouses.
limber board
A part of the ceiling alongside the keelson, easily removable for cleaning out the limber holes.
limber hole
A channel cut in the underside of a frame, close to the keel, to allow bilge water to drain away to the pump well, rather than being trapped between each set of frames.
limber strake
In traditional timber construction, the lowest permanently fastened strake of ceiling, positioned close to the keelson. It performs a structural role, usually binding together each pair of floor and first futtock.
line
The correct nautical term for the majority of the cordage or "ropes" used on a vessel. An individual line will always have a more specific name (e.g,. the mizzen topsail halyard) that specifies its use.
lines
hull lines
lines drawing
1. The depiction of the shape of a hull with three views: sheer plan, body plan and half breadth plan. The lines on these drawings denote the shape of the hull similarly to the contours of a map.
2. A general term for the shape of a hull.
3. See fine lines.
line astern
In naval warfare, a line of battle formed behind a flagship.
liner
1. During the Age of Sail, a ship-of-the-line, or a major warship capable of taking its place in the main battle line of fighting ships.
2. Any cargo or passenger ship running scheduled service along a specific route with published ports of call, excluding ferries and other vessels engaged in short-sea trading. When referring to cargo ships, "liner" contrasts with "tramp", which refers to a ship engaged in spot-market trade that does not follow a regular schedule or make regular calls at specific ports. When referring to passenger ships, "ocean liner" refers to ships providing scheduled transportation between regular ports of call, but excludes cruise ships, which voyage for recreational purposes and not primarily as a form of transportation between ports.
list

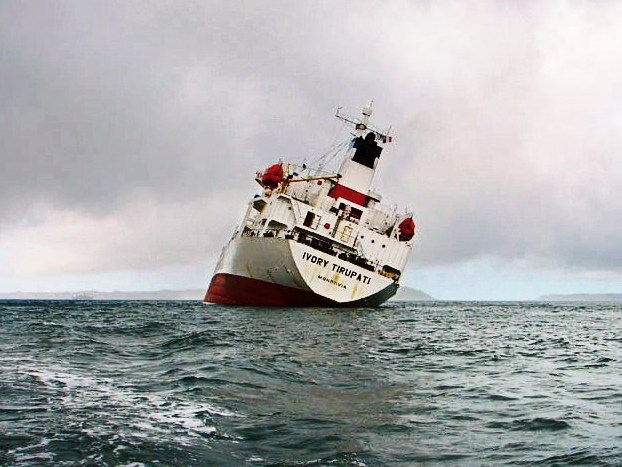
A ship with severe list

The degree or angle to which a vessel leans or tilts to one side, on the roll axis, at equilibrium, i.e. with no external forces acting upon it. The term typically refers to a lean caused by flooding or improperly loaded or shifted cargo, as opposed to heeling, which is a consequence of external forces. A vessel with such a lean is said to be listing. Compare loll.
lizard
A short length of rope with an eye, used to hold another rope in position.
LOA

loaded to the gunwales
Literally, having cargo loaded as high as the ship's rail. The term is also used as an idiom meaning "extremely drunk".
lofting
In boat construction, a drafting technique used to convert a scaled drawing to full size.
loggerhead
1. A bollard mounted in the sternsheets of a whaleboat for snubbing the whale line as a harpooned whale swam away from the boat.
2. An iron ball attached to a long handle, used for driving caulking into seams and (occasionally) in a fight; hence the expression "at loggerheads".
loll
lolling
A list to either side caused by inadequate transverse stability in the upright condition.
Long Forties
An area of the northern North Sea which is fairly consistently 40 fathoms (240 feet; 73 metres) deep. On nautical charts with depths indicated in fathoms, it appears as a long area with many "40" notations.
long stay
The relative slackness of an anchor chain; this term means taut and extended.
longboat
1. In the Age of Sail, a double-banked open boat carried by a sailing ship, rowed by eight or ten oarsmen, two per thwart, although designed also to be rigged for sailing; more seaworthy than a cutter or dinghy and with a beam greater than that of a gig. Eventually supplanted by the whaleboat.
2. The largest, and thus the most capable, of boats carried on a ship.
3. Great Lakes slang for a vessel that spends all of her time on any of the five Great Lakes, referring to the slender appearance of such vessels.
longliner
A fishing vessel rigged for longline fishing ("longlining").
longship
A type of ship invented and used by the Vikings for trade, commerce, exploration, and warfare, evolving over several centuries and appearing in its complete form between the 9th and 13th centuries.
lookout
A member of the crew specifically assigned to watch surrounding waters for other vessels, land, objects in the water, hazards, threats, etc. Lookouts usually have duty stations high on a vessel's superstructure, in a specially designed top or crow's nest, or in her rigging, in order to enhance their field of view.
loose cannon
An irresponsible and reckless individual whose behavior (either intentionally or unintentionally) endangers the group he or she belongs to. The term refers to a hypothetical literal loose cannon which, weighing thousands of pounds, would crush anything and anyone in its path, and possibly even break a hole in the hull, thus endangering the seaworthiness of the whole ship.
loose-footed
A fore-and-aftmainsail that is not connected to a boom along its foot.
lorcha
A sailing vessel of 30 to 150 tons burthen developed around 1550 that has a junk rig with Cantonese or other Chinese-style batten sails on a Portuguese or other European-style hull. The design combines the ease of handling of a junk rig with the greater speed, cargo capacity, and ease of repair of the European-style hull.
lower deck
1. The deck of a ship immediately above the hold.
2. In British usage, those members of a ship's company who are not officers, often used in the plural (e.g., "the lower decks").
lowers
The lower brails on the mainsail.
lubber's hole
A port cut into the bottom of a masthead or top (crow's-nest) allowing easy entry and exit. It was considered "un-seamanlike" to use this method rather than going over the side from the shrouds, and few sailors would risk the scorn of their shipmates by doing so (at least if there were witnesses). In practice, it is often actually quicker and easier for a fit sailor to climb outside the masthead than through the lubber's hole.
lubber's line
A line or mark inside or on a compass case or binnacle indicating the direction of the ship's head.
lucky bag
1. A locker or compartment for storage of unclaimed articles.
2. US Naval Academy yearbook.
luff
1. The forward edge of a sail.
2. The fullest or roundest part of a ship's bow.
3. To point a sailing vessel closer to the wind.
luff and touch her
To bring a vessel so close to the wind that the sails shake.
luff barge

An 18th-century term for a sailing barge with a rounded bow and not a swim-head.
luff perpendicular (LP)
The shortest distance between the clew and the luff, which is a perpendicular line from the luff to the clew. Commonly given as a percentage of the "J" measurement.
luff up
To steer a sailing vessel more towards the direction of the wind until the pressure is eased on the sheet.
luffing
1. (of a sailing vessel) Being steered far enough to windward that the sail is no longer completely filled with wind; in such a state, the luff of a fore-and-aft sail begins to flap first.
2. Loosening a sheet so far past optimal trim that the sail no longer completely fills with wind.
3. The flapping of a sail from having no wind at all.
lumber hooker
A Great Lakes ship designed to simultaneously carry her own deck load of lumber and to tow one or two barges. The barges were big old schooners stripped of their masts and running gear to carry large cargoes of lumber.
lugger
A sailing vessel with lug sails set on one, two, or more masts and perhaps lug topsails, widely used as traditional fishing boats, particularly off the coasts of France, England, and Scotland; also used as privateers and smugglers.
lug sail
A four-sided fore-and-aft sail supported by a spar along the top that is fixed to the mast at a point some distance from the center of the spar. A dipping lug had to be moved to the other side of the mast when tacking (in larger vessels, by partially lowering the sail and hauling down either the peak or the throat to move the yard across). A standing lug can be used on either tack in the same position. It was common for British fishing luggers to have a dipping lug on the foremast and a standing lug on the mizzen.
lying ahull
Waiting out a storm by dousing all sails and simply letting the boat drift.
lying to

Contents: Top	A	B	C	D	E	F	G	H	I	J	K	L	M	N	O	P	Q	R	S	T	U	V	W	X	Y	Z	See also	References

== See also ==
- Articles that link to this glossary
- Glossary of nautical terms (M–Z)
- List of ship directions
