= USCGC Eagle (WIX-327) =

Barque used as a sail training ship for the US Coast Guard Academy

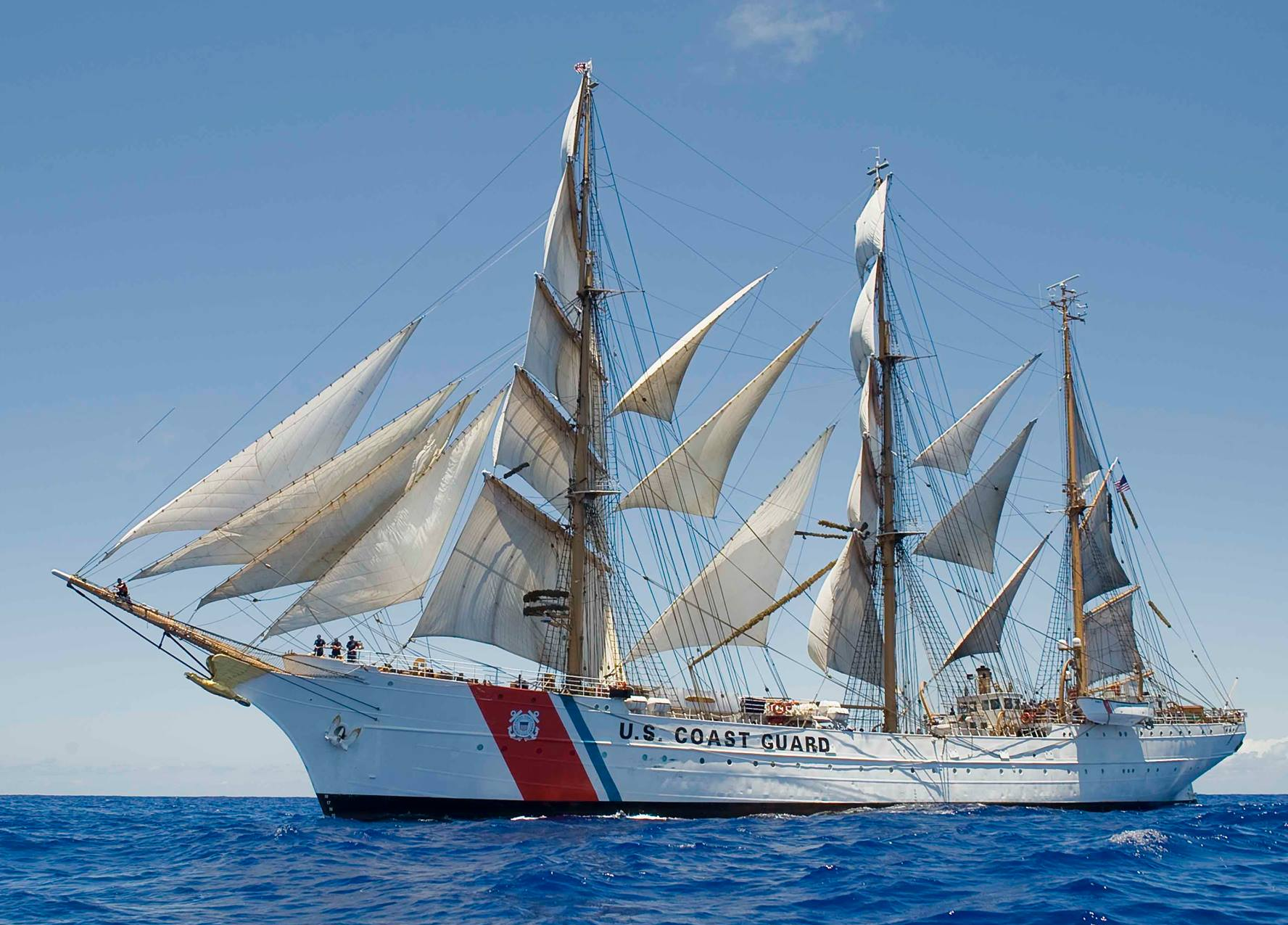
- Eagle under full sail in 2013 in the Caribbean

History

Germany
- Name: Horst Wessel
- Namesake: Horst Wessel
- Builder: Blohm+Voss, Hamburg
- Yard number: 508
- Laid down: 15 February 1936
- Launched: 13 June 1936
- Sponsored by: Bertha Luise Margarete Wessel
- Commissioned: 17 September 1936
- Decommissioned: 1939
- Recommissioned: 1942
- Captured: April 1945
- Fate: Transferred to the United States

United States
- Name: USCGC Eagle (WIX-327)
- Commissioned: 15 May 1946
- Home port: U.S. Coast Guard Academy; New London, Connecticut, U.S.
- Identification: Callsign: NRCB; IMO number: 4686589; MMSI number: 303990000
- Motto: Tradition, Seamanship, Character
- Nickname(s): "America's Tall Ship"
- Status: in active service
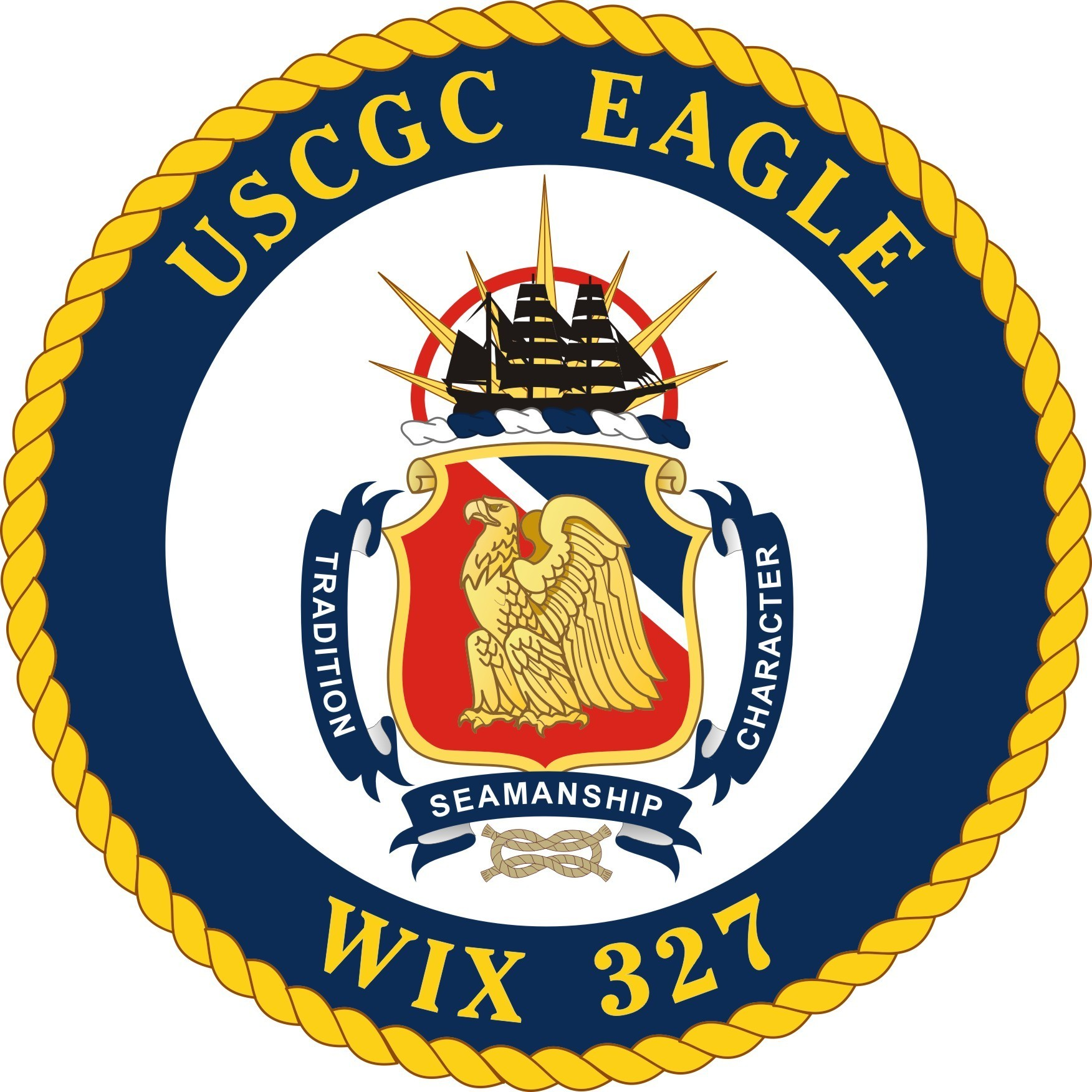
- Badge: Crest of USCGC Eagle

General characteristics
- Class & type: Gorch Fock-class barque
- Displacement: Full load: 1,784 long tons (1,813 t)
- Length: Overall: 295 ft (90 m); Waterline: 234 ft (71 m)
- Beam: 39 ft (12 m)
- Draft: Full load: 17.5 ft (5.3 m)
- Installed power: 2 × 320 kW (430 hp) Caterpillar 3406 generators
- Propulsion: 1 × 1,200 hp (890 kW) MTU 8V 4000; Diesel engine
- Sail plan: Foremast: 147.3 ft (44.9 m); Mainmast: 147.3 ft (44.9 m); Mizzenmast: 132.0 ft (40.2 m); Sail area: 22,280 sq ft (2,070 m^{2})
- Speed: Sail: 19 kn (35 km/h; 22 mph); Diesel: 10 kn (19 km/h; 12 mph)
- Range: Sail: Unlimited; Diesel: 5,450 nmi (10,093 km; 6,272 mi); at 7.5 kn (13.9 km/h; 8.6 mph)
- Complement: Permanent: 7 officers, 50 crew; When Deployed: 12 officers, 68 crew, and 150 trainees

USCGC Eagle (WIX-327), formerly Horst Wessel and also known as Barque Eagle, is a 295-foot (90 m) barque used as a training cutter for future officers of the United States Coast Guard. It is one of only two active commissioned sailing vessels in the United States military today, along with USS Constitution. It is the seventh Coast Guard cutter to bear the name in a line dating back to 1792, including the Revenue Cutter Eagle.

Each summer, Eagle deploys with cadets from the United States Coast Guard Academy and candidates from the Officer Candidate School for periods ranging from a week to two months. These voyages fulfill multiple roles. The primary mission is training the cadets and officer candidates, but the ship also performs a public relations role for the Coast Guard and the United States. Often, Eagle makes calls at foreign ports as a goodwill ambassador.

The ship was built as the German sail training ship Horst Wessel in 1936; it served to train German sailors in sail techniques until decommissioned at the start of World War II. The vessel was given anti-aircraft armament and re-commissioned in 1942. At the end of the war, Horst Wessel was taken by the U.S. as war reparations.

== Origin as Horst Wessel ==
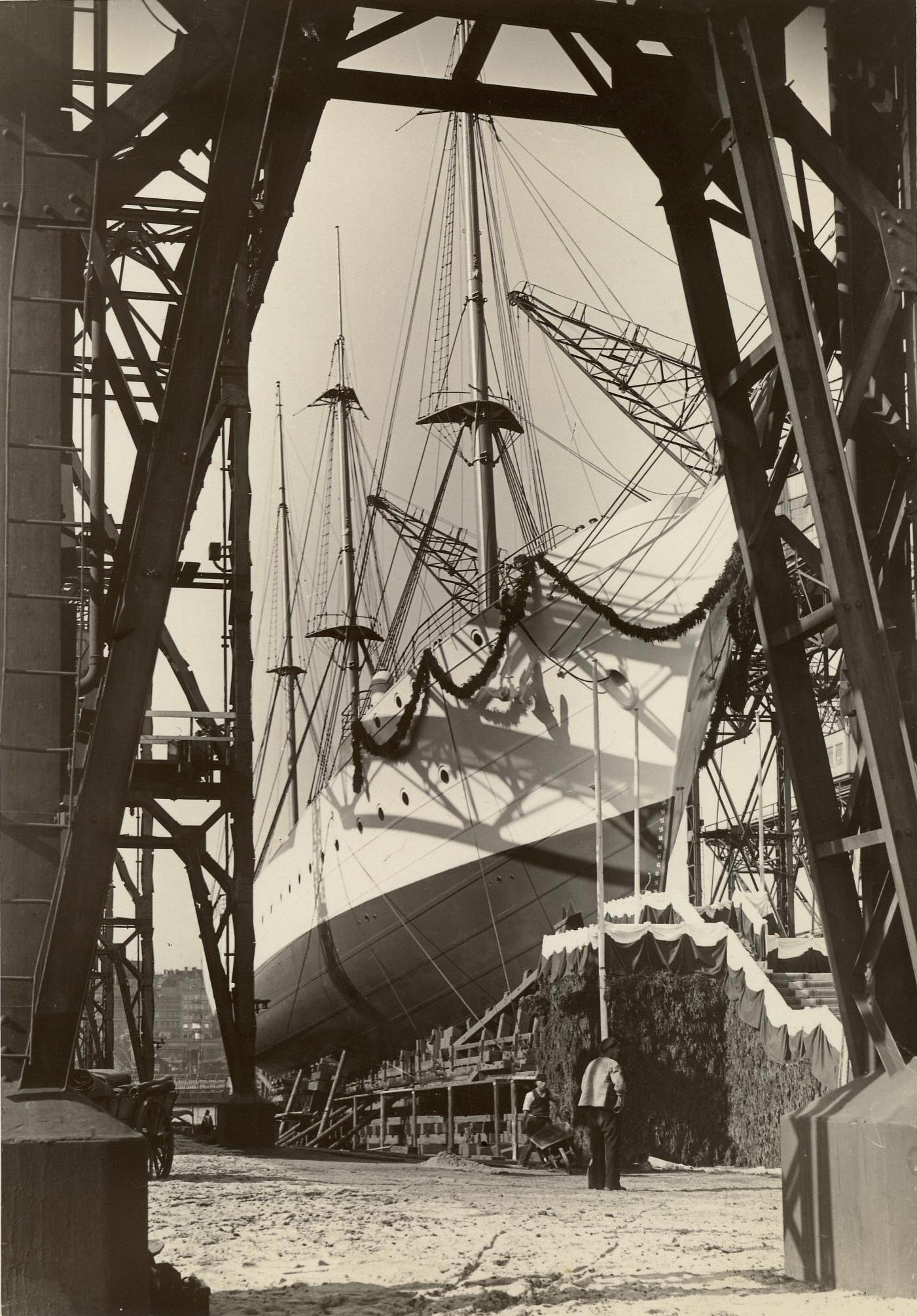
Horst Wessel launching

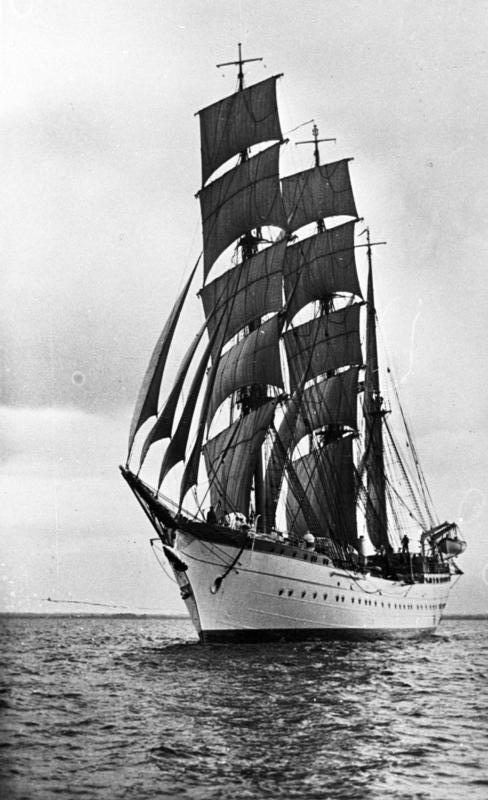
Horst Wessel in 1936

Eagle commenced its existence in Weimar Germany and Nazi Germany as Horst Wessel, a ship of the Gorch Fock class named after the original Gorch Fock (1933), not the current German training ship Gorch Fock, built in 1958 as a belated replacement for the three ships lost as war reparations. Horst Wessel was an improvement on the original 1932 design. The ship was larger in dimension and its spars were all steel, unlike Gorch Fock's wooden yards. SSS Horst Wessel began life as Schiff ("ship") 508 at Blohm+Voss in Hamburg, Germany in 1936. Her keel was laid on 15 February, she was launched on 13 June, completed on 16 September, and commissioned on 17 September. She was the second ship in the class to be built, following the class namesake Gorch Fock. Rudolf Hess gave the speech at her launch in the presence of Adolf Hitler, and Horst Wessel's mother christened the new ship with a bottle of champagne. The name was given in tribute to SA leader Horst Wessel, who had been accorded martyr status by the Nazi Party. He also wrote the song which came to be known as "Horst-Wessel-Lied", which was later used as the Nazi party's anthem. Shortly after work began on Horst Wessel, the Blohm & Voss shipyard laid the keel of the German battleship Bismarck, which was labeled Schiff 509.

SSS Horst Wessel served as the flagship of the Kriegsmarine sail training fleet, which consisted of Gorch Fock, Albert Leo Schlageter, and Horst Wessel. (Mircea was also built in 1938 for the Romanian Navy, and work began on a fifth ship called Herbert Norkus, but was stopped with the outbreak of war.) Horst Wessel was commanded by Captain August Thiele, a previous Captain of Gorch Fock, and it was homeported in Kiel. In the three years before World War II, it undertook numerous training cruises in the North Atlantic waters, sailing with trainee groups consisting of both future officers and future petty officers. On 21 August 1938, Adolf Hitler visited the ship and sailed for approximately one hour before departing. Later that year, Horst Wessel and Albert Leo Schlageter undertook a four-month voyage to the Caribbean and visited St. Thomas and Venezuela. Along the way, they caught numerous sharks and turtles at sea and kept ducks enclosed on deck to provide fresh eggs.

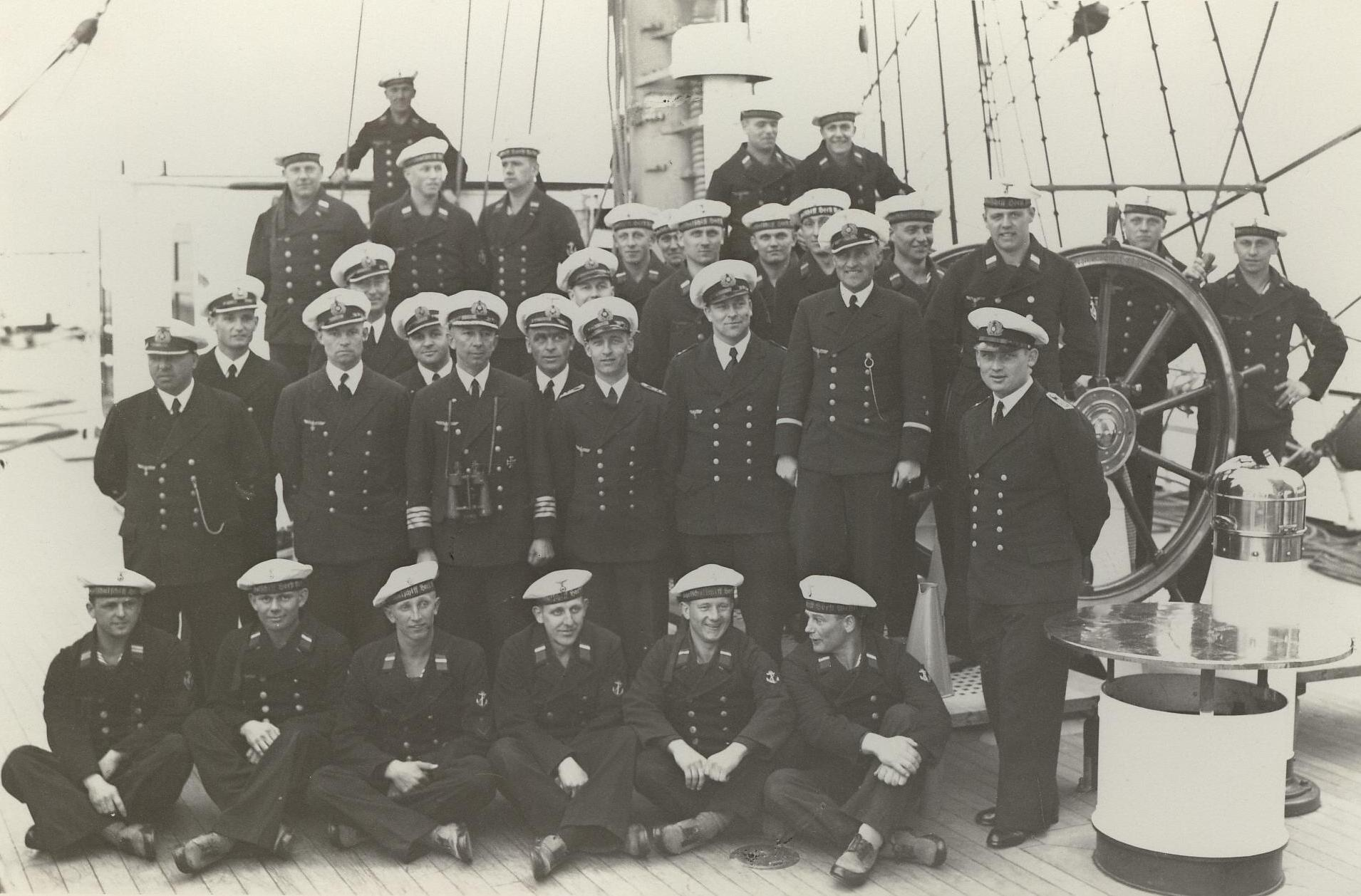
German skeleton crew in 1937

Horst Wessel was decommissioned in 1939 with the onset of World War II, but served as a docked training ship in Stralsund for the marine branch of the Hitler Youth until her recommissioning as an active Navy sail training vessel in 1942. Numerous weapons were installed throughout the decks, including two 20 mm anti-aircraft guns on the bridge wings, two on the foredeck, and two 20 mm Flakvierling quad mounts on the waist. From late 1942 through early 1945, she sailed on numerous training deployments in the Baltic sea with cadets fresh out of basic training. On 14 November 1944, accompanied by Albert Leo Schlageter, Horst Wessel was sailing in rough weather, when, near the island of Rügen, Albert Leo Schlageter hit a mine that caused extensive damage to its starboard bow. Horst Wessel took Albert Leo Schlageter in a stern tow to keep her from running aground until larger ships could arrive the next day to assist.

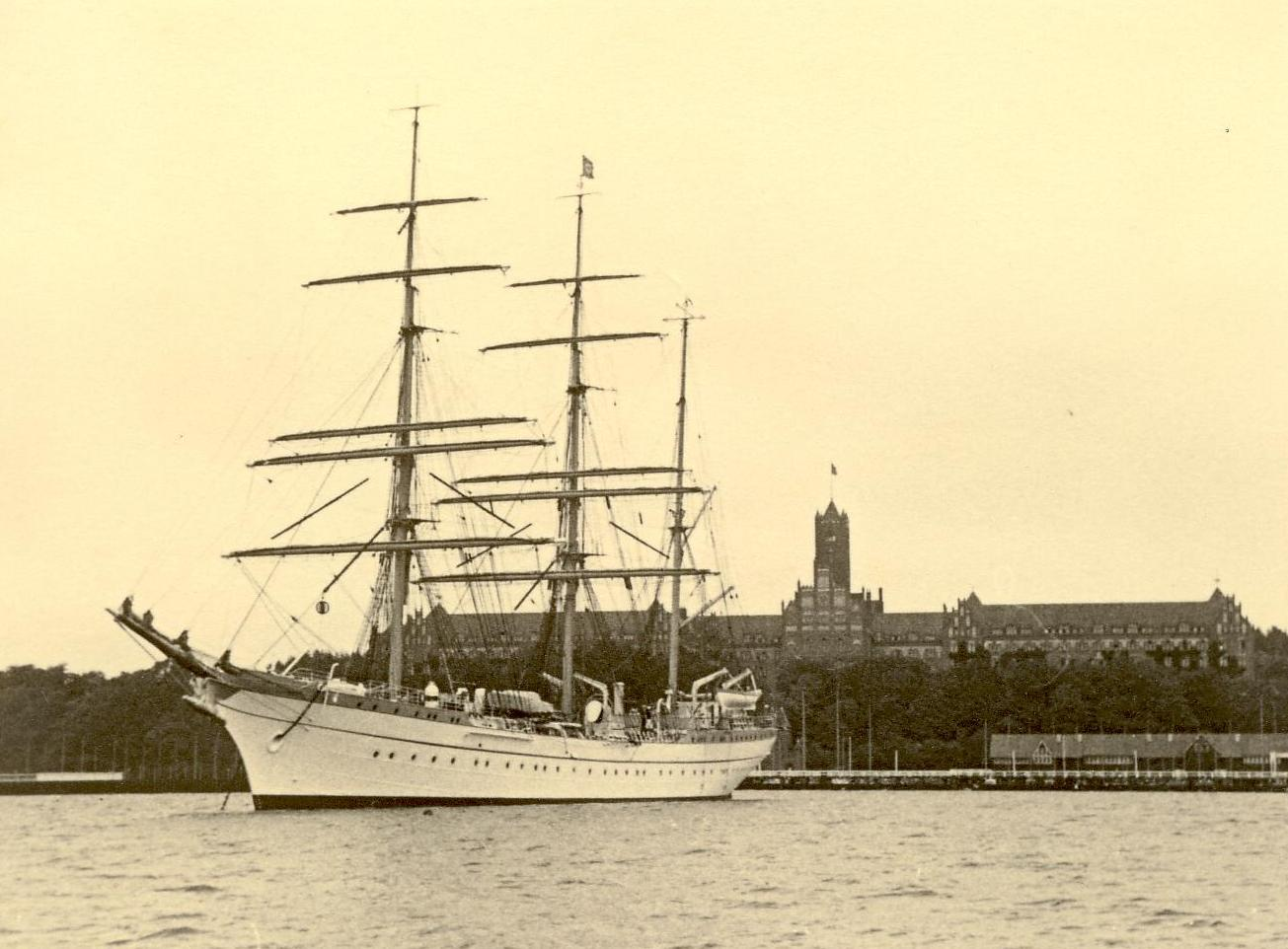
Horst Wessel in front of Naval Academy Mürwik in Flensburg in 1937

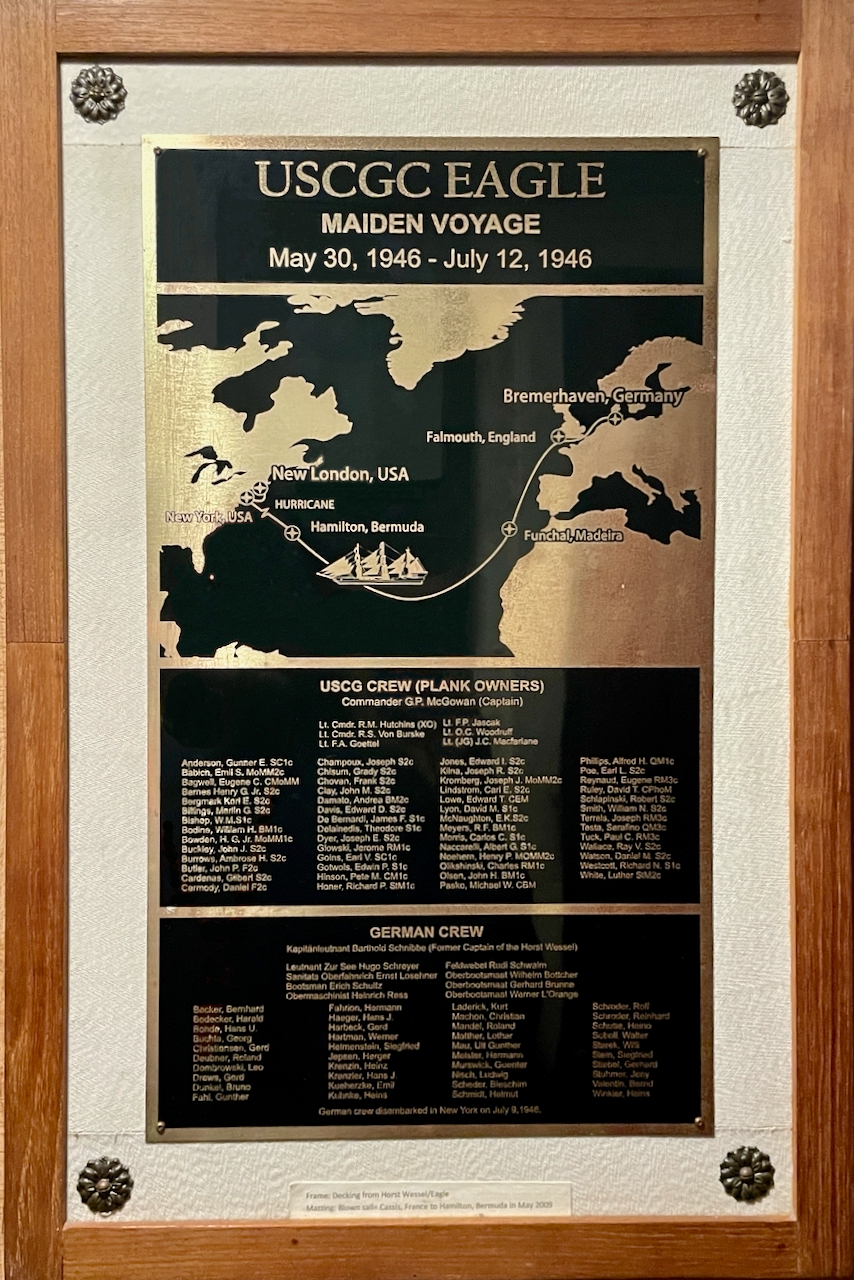
Recognition of German crew

In April 1945, after the last German cadet class had departed, Horst Wessel departed Rügen with a group of German refugees on board. She sailed to Flensburg where Kapitänleutnant Barthold Schnibbe surrendered to the British, and the ship ran up the Union Jack. Horst Wessel was ordered to Bremerhaven and tied to a temporary pier, and much of its equipment was stripped. At the end of World War II, the four German sailing vessels then extant were distributed to various nations as war reparations. Horst Wessel was won by the United States in a drawing of lots with the Soviet and British navies, and requested by the United States Coast Guard Academy's Superintendent. The ship's sails, masts, and other equipment were stripped from the Russian sister ship according to Command Master Chief William Bodine, Jr. who was the senior enlisted man on the voyage and in charge of rigging the ship for sail. On 15 May 1946, she was commissioned by CDR Gordon McGowan into the United States Coast Guard as the U.S. Coast Guard Cutter Eagle. In June 1946, a U.S. Coast Guard crew sailed her from Bremerhaven to Orangeburg, New York—through a hurricane—assisted by Kapitänleutnant Schnibbe and many of his crew who were still aboard. The German volunteer crew was disembarked at Camp Shanks and Eagle proceeded to her new home port of New London, Connecticut.

== Early afloat training at the U.S. Coast Guard Academy ==
Training at sea on a sailing vessel has always been a part of the Coast Guard Academy curriculum. In 1877, the first cadets to enroll in the United States Revenue Cutter Service, the predecessor to the U.S. Coast Guard, undertook their training on board the Revenue Cutter James C. Dobbin. In 1878, James C. Dobbin was replaced by the Revenue Cutter Salmon P. Chase. Cadets lived on board the ships (physical classrooms were not even established on shore until 1900), took classes on board in the winters when tied to a pier in New Bedford, Massachusetts or Arundel Cove, Maryland, and sailed on training deployments during the summers. During this time, Salmon P. Chase undertook numerous voyages to Europe. From 1890 to 1894, Salmon P. Chase suspended operations as there was a surplus of graduates from the United States Naval Academy. In 1907, Salmon P. Chase was decommissioned and transferred to the Marine Hospital Service. She was replaced by the Revenue Cutter Itasca, a former Naval Academy training vessel.

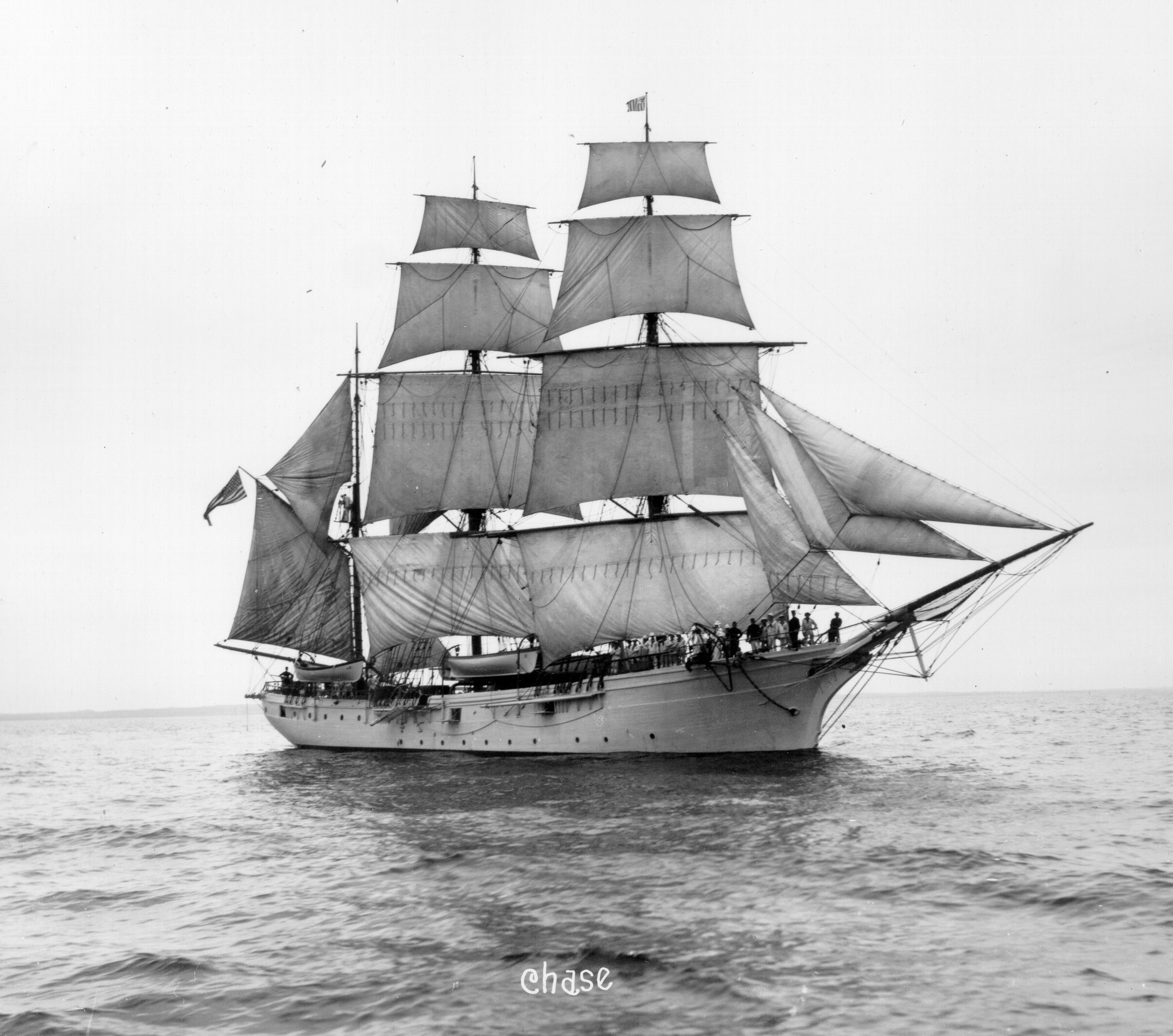
Salmon P. Chase, the Coast Guard Academy's training ship from 1878 to 1907

In 1922, Itasca was determined to be too small for the cadet corps, and was decommissioned and scrapped. She was then replaced by the three-masted barquentine Alexander Hamilton, a former Navy gunboat from the Spanish–American War. Alexander Hamilton was in service at the Coast Guard Academy until 1930; after her decommissioning in 1944, Alexander Hamilton's mainmast was returned to New London and served as the academy's flagpole until 1954. During the 1930s, the academy did not have a resident sailing vessel for cadet training. In 1939, the Danish Navy's sail training vessel Danmark was in New York City to take part in the 1939 World's Fair. After World War II broke out, the ship was offered to the U.S. government and transferred to the Coast Guard Academy, where she was commissioned as USCGC Danmark and served as the cadet training ship until 26 September 1945, when she was returned to the Danish government.

Sail training during these early years of the Coast Guard Academy is remarkably similar to the program on board Eagle today. An 1886 contemporary described the training experience on board Salmon P. Chase as such:

[A cadet] has a taste of the sternest and most trying obligations at the threshold of his undertaking, which results in a pretty thorough test of his metal [sic], and if any one is actually unfit for the sea, physical or otherwise, the fact is at once brought to the surface, and gives him an opportunity to turn back at the beginning of a career in which he would not be likely to succeed.

The cadets are arranged into watches, and in this capacity they are under the instruction of the officer of the deck, and are required to write up the remarks in the rough log, to observe carefully the making and taking in of all sail, to study the various evolutions of the vessel, transmitting and giving commands when directed, and, after reaching a certain degree of proficiency, they are exercised in charge of the deck, and in working ship in the important operations of tacking and wearing. The object is to impress them with the duties and responsibilities of deck officers, and the strictest obedience to every detail is enforced. Knotting, splicing, making mats, and learning the nomenclature of the different parts of the hull and spars, and the names and uses of ropes and sails, are among the first lessons in seamanship, and during periods of calm weather the rigging is reset and rattled down. The cadets are given constant practice in raising shears, stepping masts, reefing, furling, and shifting sails, and in sending up and down yards. Each takes his trick at the wheel, and acquaints himself with the mysteries of the compass and the steering gear. ...

In navigation the cadets are exercised in taking altitudes with the sextant, of the sun, moon, planets, and stars. They are required to determine daily the latitude and longitude of the vessel, and establish the ships position by dead-reckoning and by the different sailing problems. ... The cadets are trained in the working of all classes of broadside and pivot guns, and are familiarized with the duties and stations of officers of divisions; they are taught the construction of magazines, the uses of fuses and projectiles, and the nature and properties of power and combustibles; are stationed at fire quarters and at the boats, and in case of an alarm at sea are required to act promptly in the discharge of their several duties.

== Training at sea on board Eagle ==
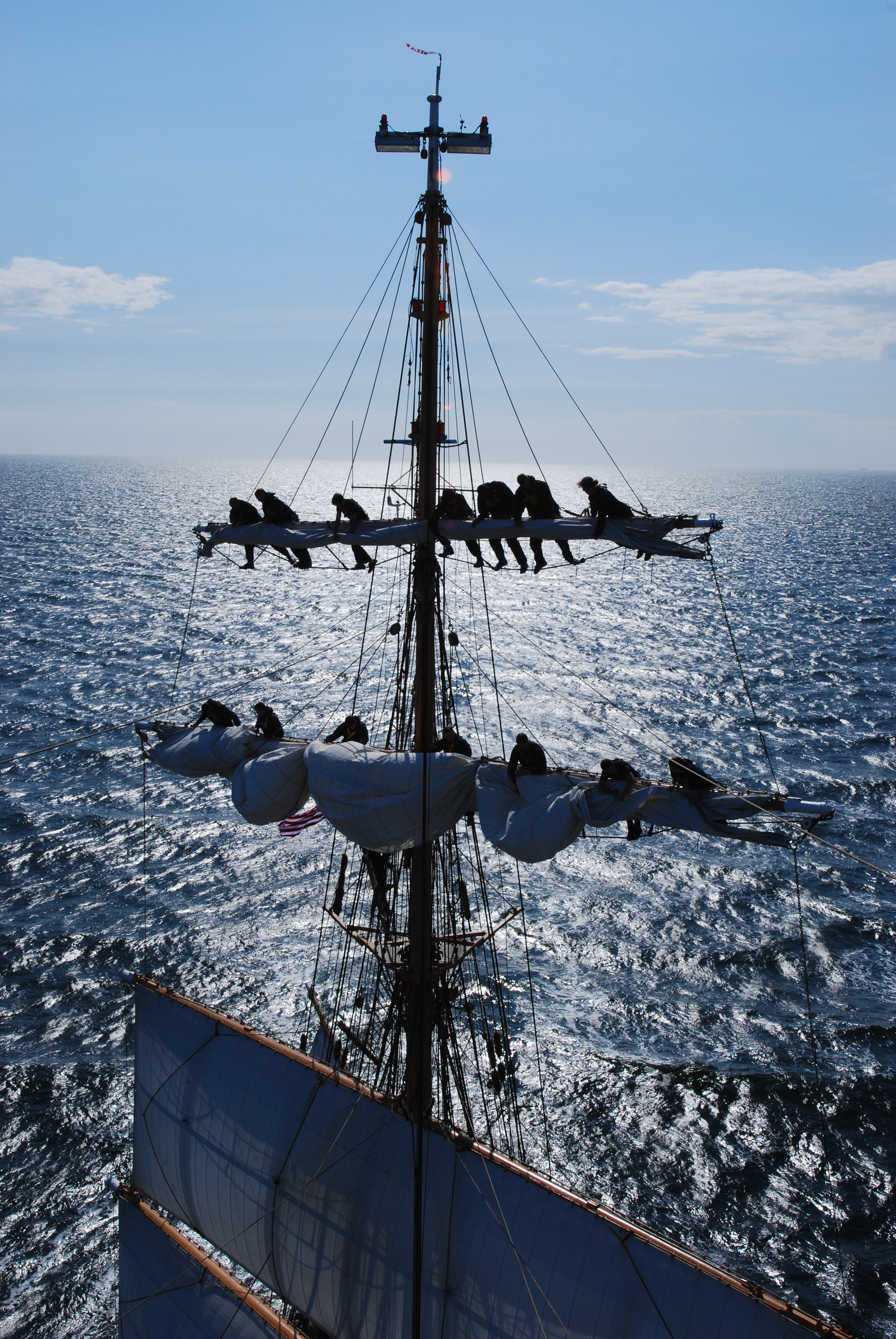
Coast Guard Academy cadets furling sail in the Atlantic Ocean in 2012

Eagle's primary mission is to develop the future officers of the U.S. Coast Guard. Since 1946, she has deployed each summer with cadets on board as part of their Academy curriculum. As soon as the cadets complete their final examinations in May of each year, Eagle departs with roughly half of the third class cadets (the rising sophomores) and a small contingent of first class cadet cadre (rising seniors who lead the third class cadets). Six weeks later, the cadets on board rotate to other training locations while the second half of the third class cadets meet the ship and begin their training. After their five weeks on board, the third and first class cadets depart for their summer leave, and the fourth class cadets (the rising freshmen; also known as swabs) report aboard in two or three groups for one week of sail training each. Like the third class cadets, the fourth class cadets are led by a group of second class cadet cadre (the rising juniors). Eagle typically returns to New London at the end of the summer, returning the cadets to the Coast Guard Academy one or two weeks before the academic school year begins. All cadets at the academy will normally complete a minimum of six weeks on board Eagle during their fourth and third class years, and have the opportunity to return as cadre if they chose to do so during their second and first class years. The current schedule also includes two 2–3 week voyages in the Spring and Fall with the semiannual Coast Guard Officer Candidate School classes.

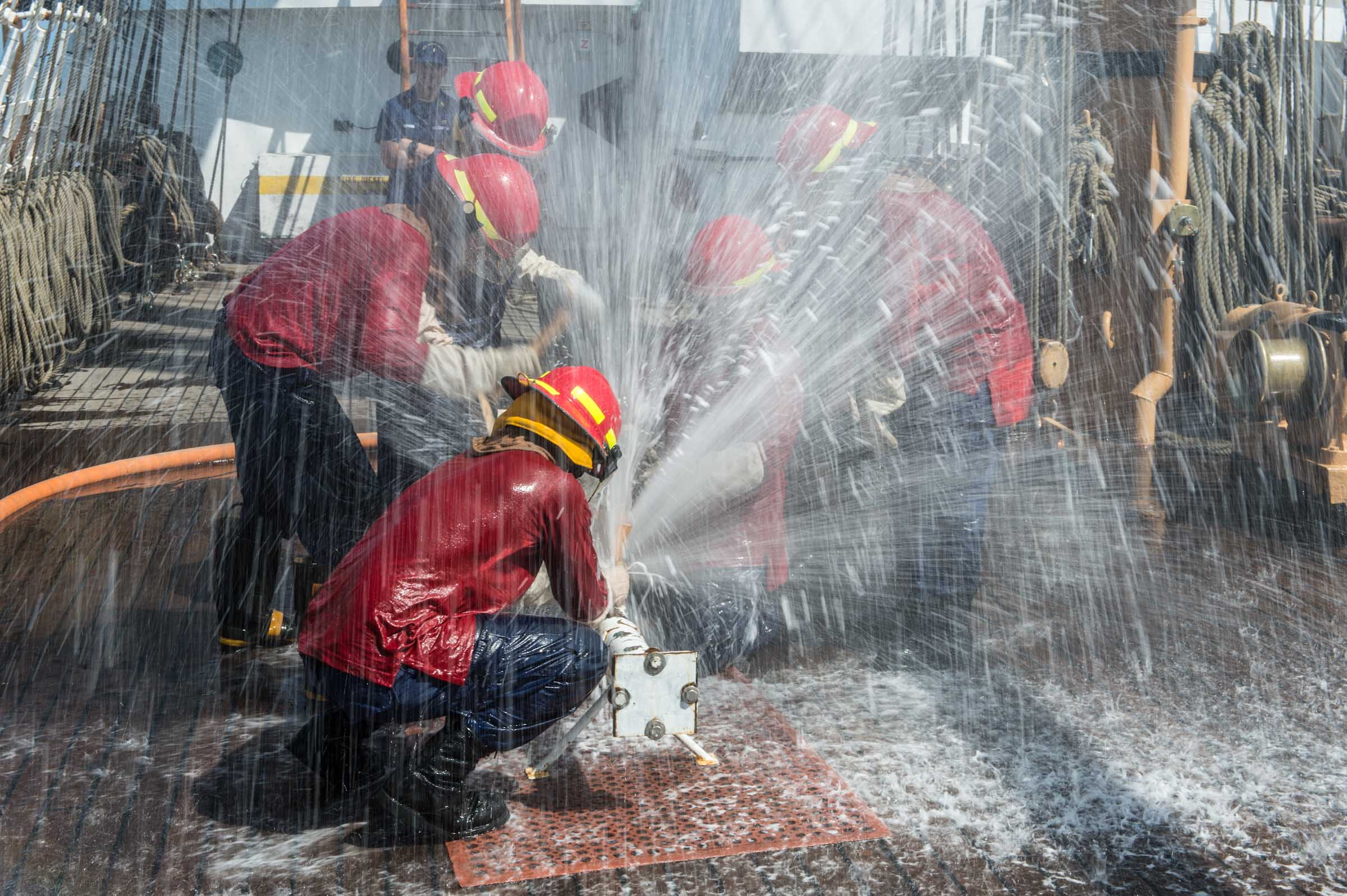
Coast Guard Academy cadets routinely take part in damage control training on board Eagle, learning to make any repairs afloat, including patching leaking pipes

Eagle has a standing permanent crew of seven officers and 50 enlisted members; on training missions, she takes on a variety of temporary crew and sails with an average complement of 12 officers, 68 crew, and up to 150 trainees. While on board, cadets and officer candidates receive a large amount of instruction from the crew. They take classes on numerous subjects that are key to life at sea, including navigation, seamanship, ship and boat maneuvering, line handling, sailing, first aid, weather patterns, damage control, engineering, career development, and more. They also stand watches in the engine room, on the bridge, on deck, in the scullery and galley, and during port calls, they assist the public by giving tours. The trainees are expected to qualify in a variety of watchstations applicable to their level of experience; for example, third class cadets complete their 'helm and lookout' qualification while upper-class cadets work to qualify in leadership positions on the bridge and in the engine room. At the same time, trainees are given a rigorous set of nautical tasks they must complete. One common training task involves the Eagle crew covering all Global Positioning System receivers on board and requiring trainees to navigate between ports using sextants, a compass, and the tools of celestial navigation.

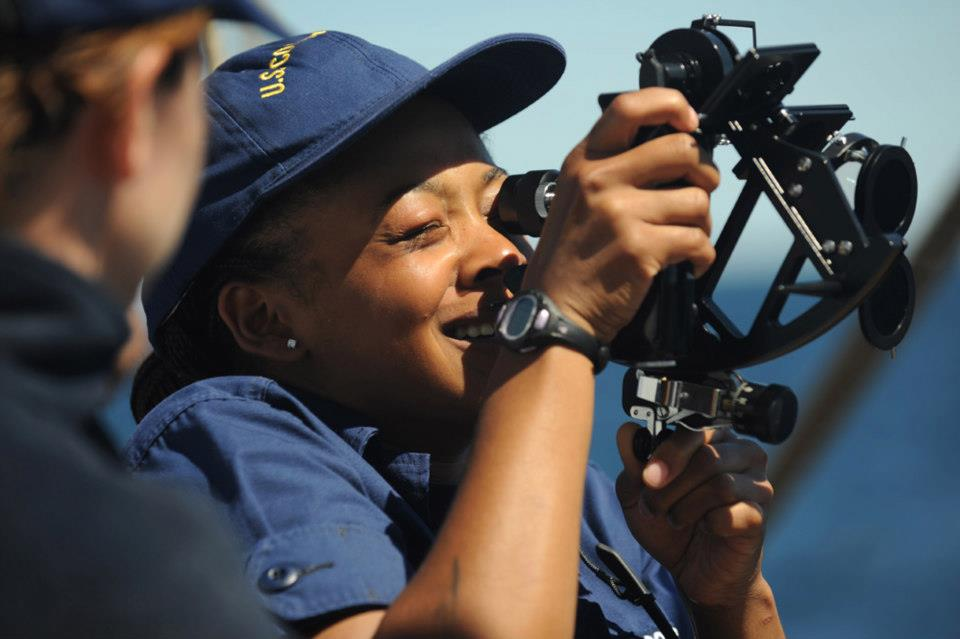
A Coast Guard officer candidate uses a sextant to shoot a sun line to determine Eagle's position in 2012

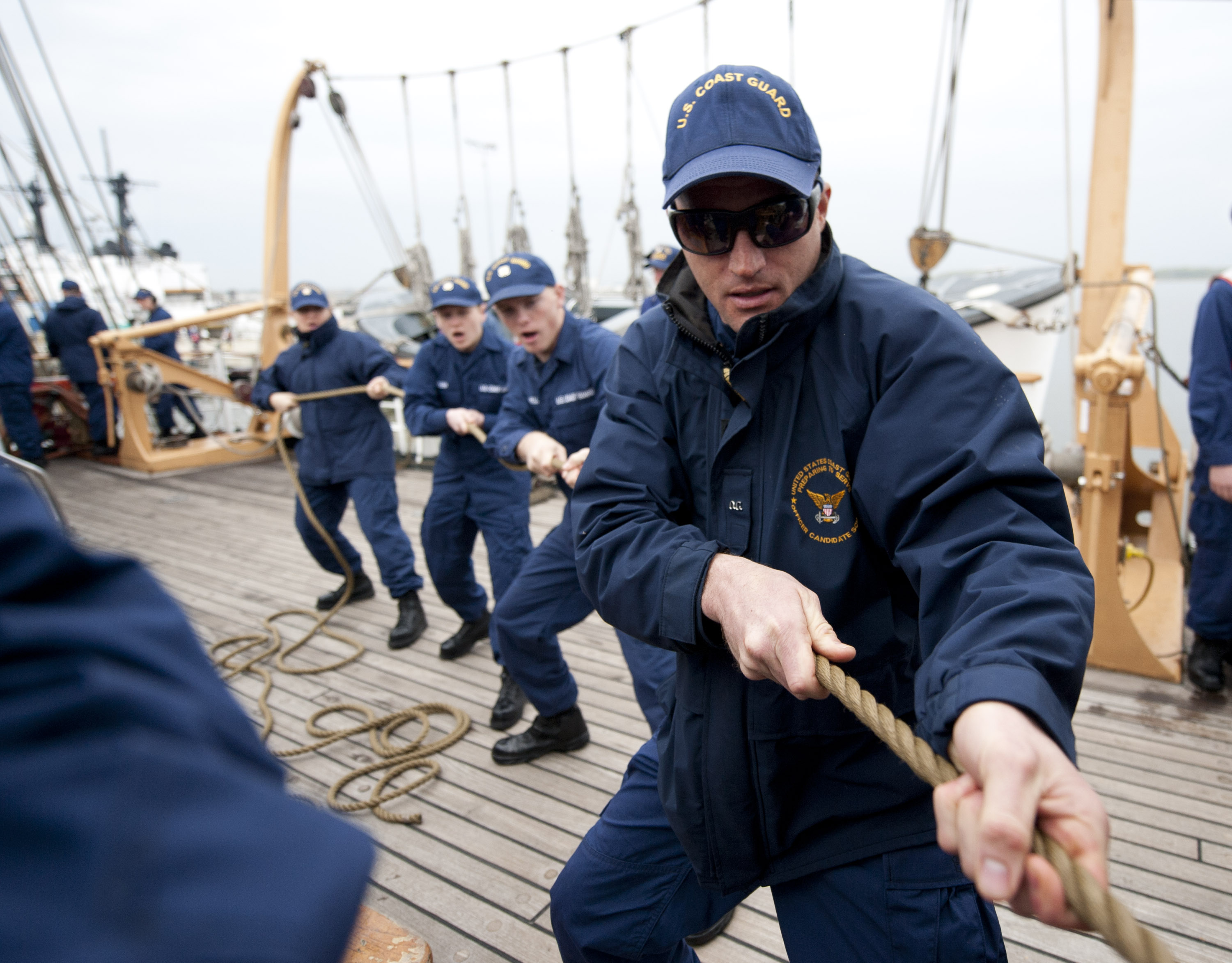
A Coast Guard officer candidate leads a group of future Boatswain Mate Petty Officers in handling a line on Eagle's mizzenmast in 2013

On a normal training day, Eagle will set 'sail stations' once or twice and all cadets and crew members will take their positions on deck to set or douse sail, or conduct a sailing maneuver such as tacking or wearing. At the beginning of a deployment with a new group of trainees, these complicated maneuvers are closely managed and led by the crew, but as the trainees become more experienced and learn how to work the sails and lines, they slowly take over leadership of these and other evolutions and begin to lead themselves. The goal of the crew is to help the trainees develop and mold into a cohesive team and a group of leaders, enabling the crew to take a step back, assist where needed, and ensure all personnel are kept safe.

In March 1998 Eagle trained her first and only class of future Coast Guard enlisted members, taking on the boot camp company November-152. The members flew from the United States Coast Guard Training Center Cape May in Cape May, New Jersey to Roosevelt Roads Naval Station in Puerto Rico. After just three days of training on shore, Eagle sailed to Fort-de-France, Martinique; La Guaira, Venezuela; and Cartagena, Colombia. The future seamen and firemen then finally returned home to New London for boot camp graduation. In recent years, when able to do so, Eagle has supplemented the officer candidate deployments with future petty officers undergoing training classes at Coast Guard Training Center Yorktown to become Boatswain's mates. Additionally, since 2013, when the National Oceanic and Atmospheric Administration (NOAA) moved its Officer Candidate Training program to the Coast Guard Academy, NOAA Officer Candidates have taken part in the Spring and Fall Officer Candidate deployments.

== "America's Tall Ship" ==
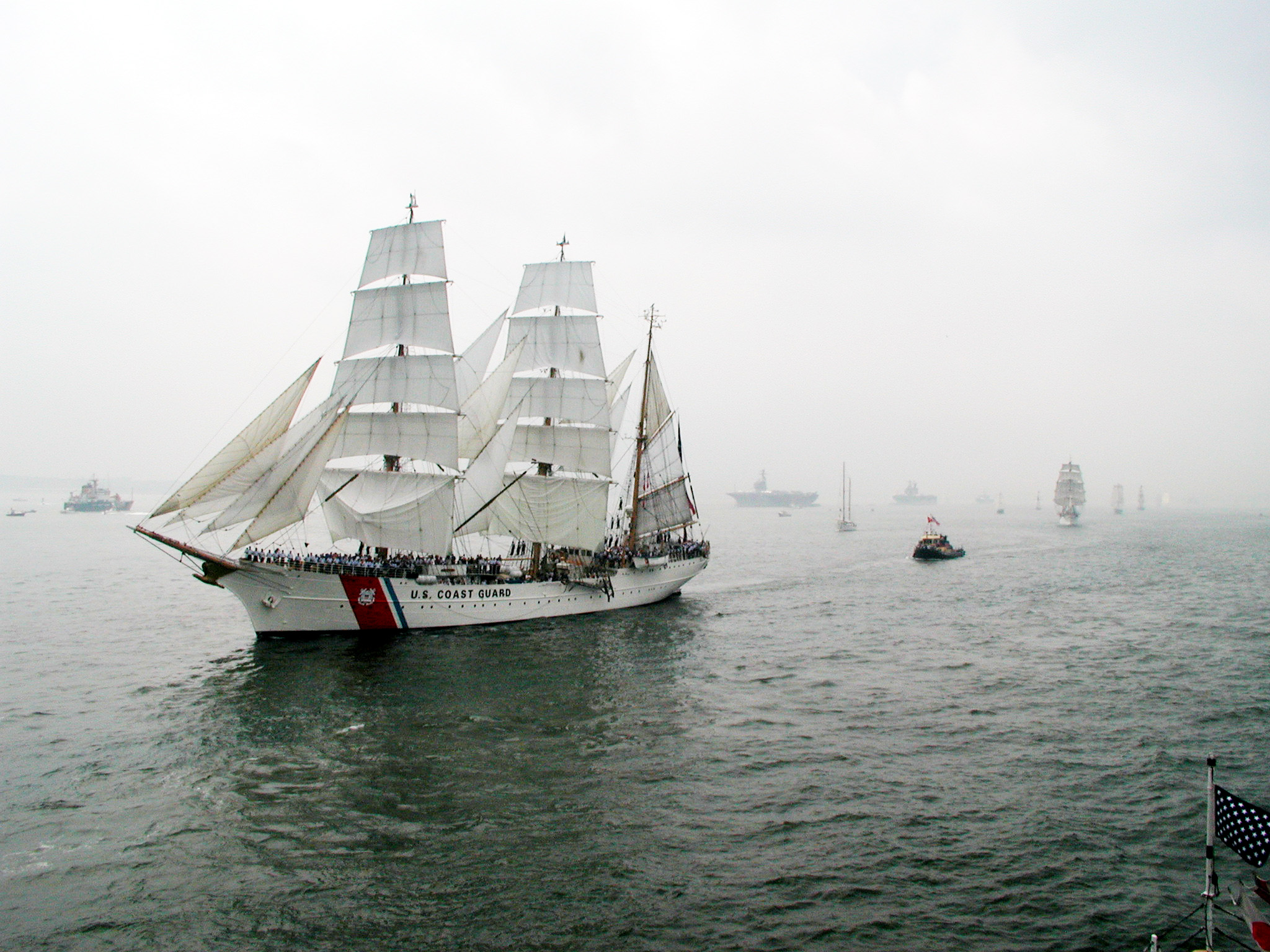
USCGC Eagle leading a parade of ships in New York on the 4th of July, 2000

Eagle's secondary mission is to represent the U.S. Coast Guard and the United States to the public and the international community. In this role, she has earned the nickname of "America's Tall Ship." During her many years of service as a Coast Guard cutter, she has traveled to harbors throughout the United States and around the world. Among her various training deployments, Eagle has participated in various Tall Ship races and events, including the Operation Sail events of 1964, 1976, 1986, 1992, 2000 and 2012. Most notably, Eagle led the parade of ships into New York Harbor during the American Bicentennial OpSail of 1976. In the summer of 1974, during the kick-off race for OpSail 1976 (from Newport, Rhode Island to Boston, Massachusetts), the participating ships encountered heavy weather and a number of other ships dropped out. Off Cape Cod, Eagle maintained a speed of 19 knots (35 km/h) on a broad reach under sail alone for a number of hours.

Eagle made her first visit to the Pacific Ocean in 1965 under the command of LCDR Peter A. Morrill, who later went on to become the namesake of Morrill Peak in Antarctica, which he discovered aboard USCGC Westwind in 1967.

At the request of the West German government, Eagle returned to Germany for the first time since 1946 in honor of the 1972 Summer Olympics, visiting the port of Kiel where she had formerly moored on numerous occasions as Horst Wessel. The visit included a five-day race against Gorch Fock II, Germany's replacement for the Gorch Fock built in 1958, and the Polish sail training vessel Dar Pomorza. Three days into the race, numerous sails onboard Eagle ripped and had to be removed, and Eagle lost the race. Eagle again returned to Germany in 1977, 1988, 1996 (her 60th anniversary), 2005, and 2011 (her 75th anniversary).

In 1975, Eagle transported the remains of Hopley Yeaton, the first Revenue Cutter Service officer commissioned by President George Washington, from Lubec, Maine to the Coast Guard Academy where he was laid to rest at the Captain Hopley Yeaton Memorial.

In 1984, under the leadership of Captain Ernst Cummings and Boatswain Richard 'Red' Shannon, Eagle took part in a tall ship's race with the Dar Pomorza, the Venezuelan ship Simón Bolívar, and the 117 ft (36 m) British barque Marques. On 2 June, after the weather worsened, Captain Cummings ordered sail taken in. As the deck watch prepared to go aloft to furl sail, Eagle was hit by a squall with 70 knots (130 km/h) winds, forcing her into a 45–50 degree heel. Boatswain Shannon ordered the rudder to 'right full' and the ship slowly righted herself.

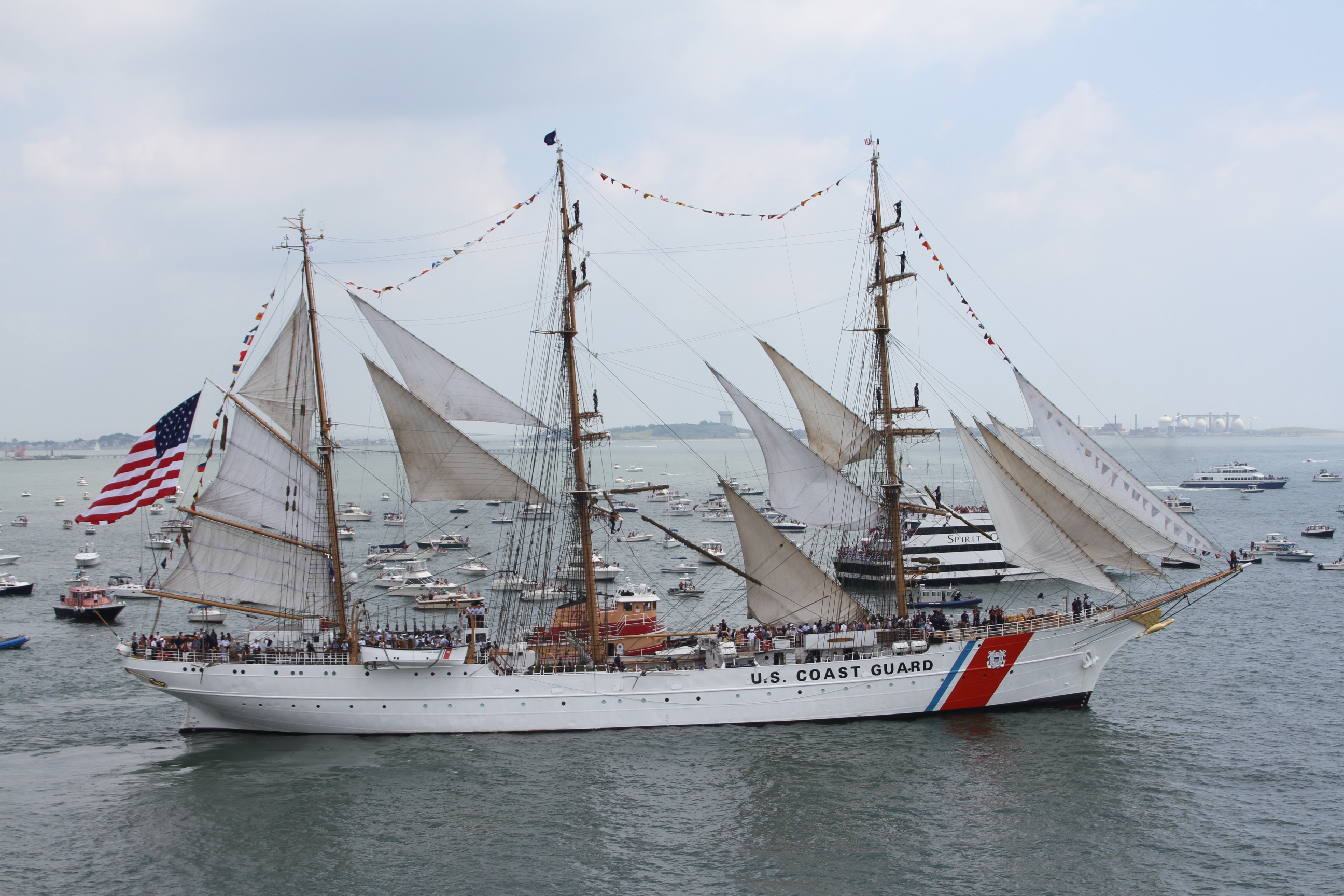
Eagle in Boston Harbor on 4 July 2012 as part of the OPSAIL 2012 celebrations

At the personal invitation of Australian Prime Minister Bob Hawke, Eagle departed the Coast Guard Academy in September 1987 to undertake an ambitious yearlong deployment in honor of the Australian Bicentenary celebrations taking place in 1988. She made her first trip west of the International Date Line into Oceania, inducting her crew into the Domain of the Golden Dragon. During this voyage Academy instructors were embarked to conduct the cadets' classes while underway. The trip included Eagle's only visits to American Samoa and Hawaii and visits to the Australian ports of Lord Howe Island, Newcastle, Brisbane, Hobart, Sydney, and Manly, covering more than 32,000 miles and spending more than eight months away from New London. She joined a half dozen ships who travelled from London in recreation of the First Fleet, along with representatives from 20 different countries in a grand parade of sail for the festivities in Sydney on 26 January 1988.

From 1996 to 1999, Eagle was commanded by Captain Robert J. Papp Jr., who went on to serve as the Commandant of the Coast Guard from 2010 to 2014. One significant voyage included a European tour to visit to Eagle's birthplace of Hamburg, Germany for her 60th Anniversary in 1996.

In 2005, as part of the Trafalgar 200 International Fleet Review in the Solent off southern England celebrating the 200 year anniversary of Admiral Horatio Nelson's victory at the Battle of Trafalgar, Eagle was one of a number of tall ships from several nations to be reviewed by Queen Elizabeth II, along with the U.S. Navy warship USS Saipan. Later that summer, Eagle returned to Bremerhaven for the first time since World War II and received an enthusiastic welcome.

In 2010 she participated in Velas Sudamerica 2010, a historical Latin American tour by eleven tall ships to celebrate the bicentennial of the first national governments of Argentina and Chile.

Eagle celebrated her 75th anniversary with a visit to the Landungsbrücken Pier in Hamburg, across from the Blohm & Voss shipyards where she was built. On her return from Germany, she visited Reykjavík, Iceland where she crossed into the Arctic Circle for the first time, inducting her crew into the Order of the Blue Nose.

In 2012, as part of the Tall Ships Challenge hosted by Tall Ships America in conjunction with Operation Sail 2012, Eagle took part in a two-day race off the coast of Nova Scotia with a large group of tall ships from all over North America. After 32 hours of calm waters, the wind began to blow and Eagle won the race in a dramatic fashion.

Her 2020 cruise was abbreviated due to the COVID-19 pandemic, and her voyages were limited to the Long Island Sound and returning to New London without making any port calls. She resumed her voyages with port calls in Portugal, Iceland, and Bermuda in 2021.

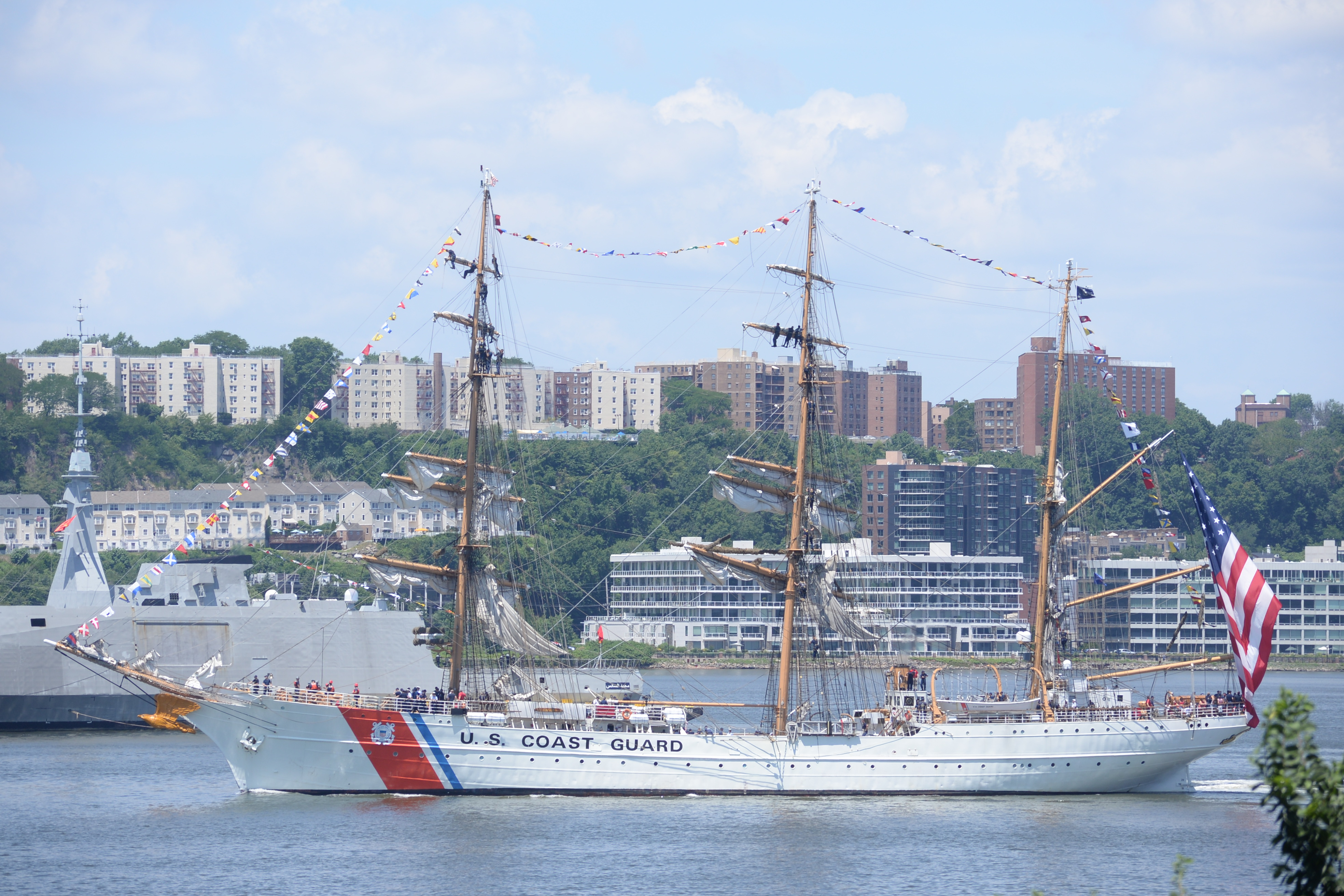
The Eagle sails down the Hudson River during Sail250.

The Eagle served as the flagship for Sail250 in 2026, a gathering of tall and military ships at port cities across the United States to mark the country's 250th anniversary.

== Design ==
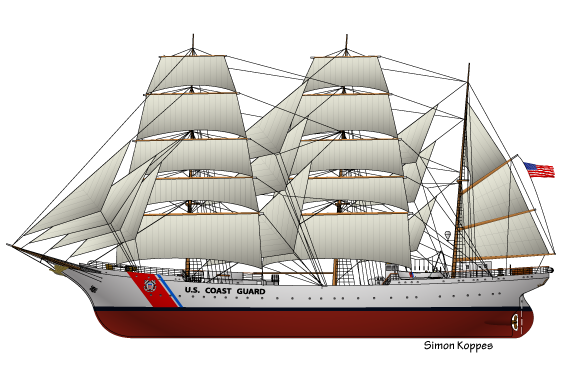
Line art of USCGC Eagle

Eagle is slightly larger than her sister ship Gorch Fock. Overall Eagle displaces 1,824 tons. The hull is riveted Krupp steel four-tenths of an inch thick (10 mm). There are two full-length steel decks with a platform deck below. The raised forecastle and quarterdeck are made of quarter inch steel overlaid with 3 inches (76 mm) of teak, as are the weather decks.

Auxiliary propulsion was originally provided by a single Burmeister & Wain diesel with reduction gear producing 750 horsepower (560 kW). She was refitted with a 1,000 horsepower (750 kW) Caterpillar D399 V16 diesel engine in 1980, and again with a 1,200 horsepower (890 kW) MTU 8V 4000 in 2018, providing speeds up to 17 knots (20 mph; 31 km/h) under power.

There are two 320 kW (430 hp) Caterpillar generators that can be run by themselves or in parallel together. Eagle has a range of 5,450 nautical miles (10,000 km) at her cruising speed of 7.5 knots (14 km/h) under diesel power. She carries a reverse osmosis system that replenishes the ship's fresh water supply at sea.

Eagle has a three-masted barque sailing rig, with two masts fully rigged with 'square sails' and one mast with only 'fore-and-aft' sails. The large sail area of the 'square sails' provide much of the power while the 'fore-and-aft' sails enable superior maneuverability. The ship has over 6 miles (9.7 km) of running rigging and approximately 22,280 square feet (2,070 m^{2}) of sail area. To protect sails from chafing, Eagle uses baggywrinkle extensively. The top three yards of the fore- and main masts are moveable, and are kept lowered when not sailing to lower the ship's center of gravity. In addition, the top portion of the fore- and main masts, known as the topgallant masts, may be housed (lowered) by 13 ft when not under sail in order to sail underneath low bridges. Eagle's fastest point of sail is when her yards are braced sharp (or pivoted as much as they can be) and the relative wind (the wind you feel standing on the ship as it moves) is approximately 5–10 degrees aft of the windward leech of the sail. When fully braced, Eagle can sail about 75 degrees off of the true wind. Eagle's propeller shaft can also be de-clutched from the engine so the propeller can freewheel, thus lessening drag while under sail.

The main helm station, also known as the triple helm, is connected via mechanical shaft linkage to the steering gear located in the "captain's coffin" on the fantail along with the emergency, or "trick" wheel (also referred to as aft steering). Three turns of the main helm station equal one degree of rudder turn. That is why six persons are used to steer during heavy weather and while operating in restricted waterways. The emergency, or "trick" wheel is a single wheel that turns at a rate of one revolution to one degree of rudder turn. It thus requires more force to turn.

=== Changes from original design ===
The ship has undergone numerous refits since she was acquired by the Coast Guard in 1946. Sometime during the 1950s, Captain Carl Bowman replaced Eagle's split spanker on the mizzenmast with a single sail. During the 1980s, under Captain David Wood, the split spanker was returned as it afforded reduced weather helm and allowed the helmsman to turn away (or 'fall off') from the wind more easily.

On 27 January 1967, Eagle departed the Coast Guard Yard maintenance facility at Curtis Bay (near Baltimore, Maryland). On a foggy afternoon with little visibility, she traveled toward the Chesapeake Bay at 6 knots (11 km/h). Shortly after 1:30 PM Eagle collided with the motor vessel Philippine Jose Abad Santos. Fortunately, nobody on either ship was injured. Eagle returned to the shipyard and underwent repairs.

On 1 July 1972, the ship was returning to her berth at the Coast Guard Academy in New London at the midpoint of her annual summer cadet training deployment when she was involved in another serious accident. Despite extensive precautions, as the ship passed below the Gold Star Memorial Bridge and a new twin bridge being built parallel to it, her foremast and mainmast caught on some safety netting slung below the new bridge that had not been fully secured. Both masts were snapped off above the crosstrees (about seven-eighths of the way up each mast), and the upper parts were left hanging from the remaining upright parts of the masts. As a result, the ship had to undergo emergency repairs. The Electric Boat facility in Groton, Connecticut was able to repair the masts in time for Eagle's planned deployment to Europe; she set sail just three and a half weeks later on 24 July.

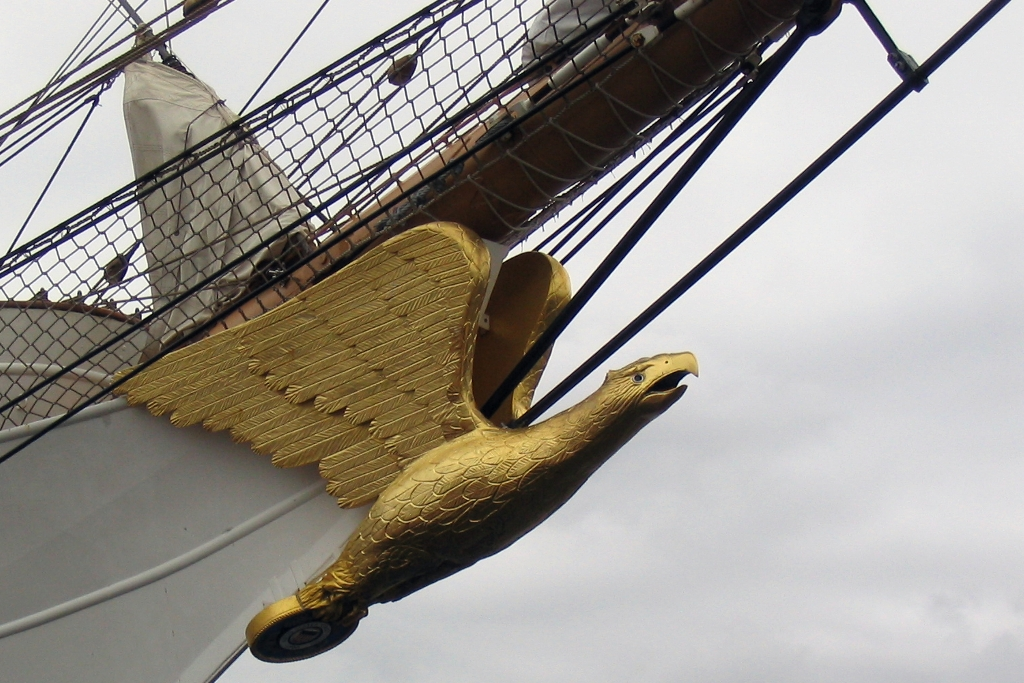
Eagle's 1976 figurehead

1976 brought significant changes to Eagle. The Coast Guard added their "racing stripe" and the words 'Coast Guard' to her otherwise unadorned white hull. In addition, the eagle figurehead on the bowsprit of the ship was replaced. The original eagle figurehead now resides on display in the U.S. Coast Guard Museum in Waesche Hall at the Coast Guard Academy. Finally, in 1976, Eagle received Captain Paul Welling, her first permanent Commanding Officer since Captain Barthold Schnibbe of the German Navy. Previous Commanding Officers had been drawn temporarily from officers assigned to the academy.

By 1979, the Coast Guard had developed plans for an extensive refit at the Coast Guard Yard facility. From 1979 to 1983, Eagle visited the yard all four winters between summer deployments. During these maintenance availability periods her original 1936 Burmeister & Wain diesel engine, known affectionately as 'Elmer,' along with the generators and evaporators, were replaced by modern equipment ('Elmer' was given to the Portuguese vessel Sagres, the former Albert Leo Schlageter, to provide spare parts for her engine). This made the engine room more spacious, less noisy, and far cooler in temperature. The new engine could be controlled directly from the bridge through a pressurized air line and responded instantly, rather than after a 30-second delay common with the original engine. Additional watertight compartmentalization was also added (previously, there had been only seven). This compartmentalization included closing in cadet berthing areas, eliminating separate upper-class (fixed three-tier bunks) and lower-class (hammock) berthing and made the ship better able to accommodate male and female cadets. Crew habitability was greatly improved with the installation of new ventilation and air conditioning systems, fresh water showers, and fresh water clothes washing machines. An enclosed pilothouse was built around the exhaust funnel on the quarterdeck. Electronic equipment (e.g., radar, navigation, and radio equipment) was updated as well, and much of it was moved from the radio room into the new pilothouse. The helm station remained unsheltered and unchanged. Finally, the entire teak deck was replaced, and the steel beneath it was found to be badly corroded and had to be repaired as well. For two summers, Eagle sailed without parts of her teak deck. It was discovered that the teak deck is one of the keys to 'stiffening' the longitudinal strength of the ship.

In 2014, Eagle began a similar refit. The ship's crew temporarily shifted its administrative homeport to Baltimore and began an extensive four-year service life extension project. Each year, Eagle spent six months in the yard and six months sailing with trainees. The goal of this maintenance overhaul was for the ship to remain safe and viable as the Coast Guard's premier training vessel well into the 21st century. Significant work was conducted on the HVAC system, engine room, hull, and other systems. Her 1980 Caterpillar auxiliary propulsion unit was replaced by a new motor from MTU in the winter of 2017–2018. After the refit was completed, Eagle returned to her traditional homeport of New London, Connecticut.

=== Figurehead ===
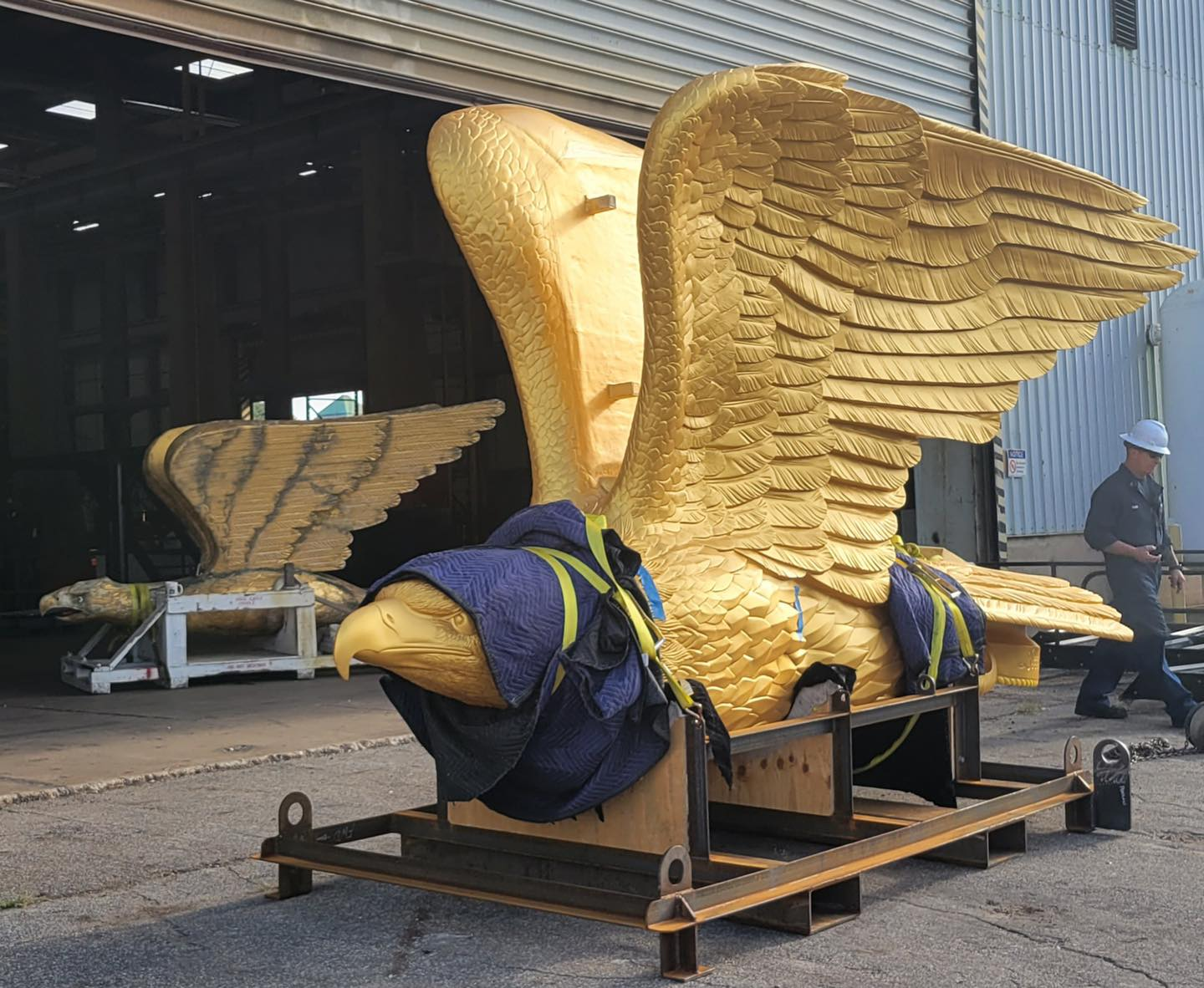
Eagle's 2021 figurehead with the 1976 figurehead in the background.

Eagle has had 5 figureheads over the course of her career. Horst Wessel's original figurehead was an eagle clutching a wreath containing a Nazi swastika. The swastika was removed when CDR McGowan took possession of Eagle, and a Bremerhaven shipyard donated a US Coast Guard shield carved in teak to replace it. McGowan later wrote that it was a "rare coincidence that the future Eagle should have such a figurehead." Eagle's predecessor, the 150 foot long Salmon P Chase also had an eagle as a figurehead which was on display at Mystic Seaport. The Coast Guard traded their figurehead for Salmon P Chase's 5 foot long figurehead in 1953, which was affectionately called the "pigeon" on the much larger Eagle. The Salmon P Chase's figurehead was starting to show her age and was replaced with a fiberglass replica in 1971. The fiberglass version only lasted a couple years, it was quickly destroyed in a storm only a couple years following its installation. An appropriately sized, 13 foot long, 3/4 ton mahogany eagle was unveiled for the bicentennial celebrations in 1976. The 1976 figurehead was discovered to have some cracks during her 2014 refit, and a replacement recommended. The current figurehead, installed in 2021, is 15 feet long, weighs 2,000 pounds, and was designed by California artist Shane Kinman.

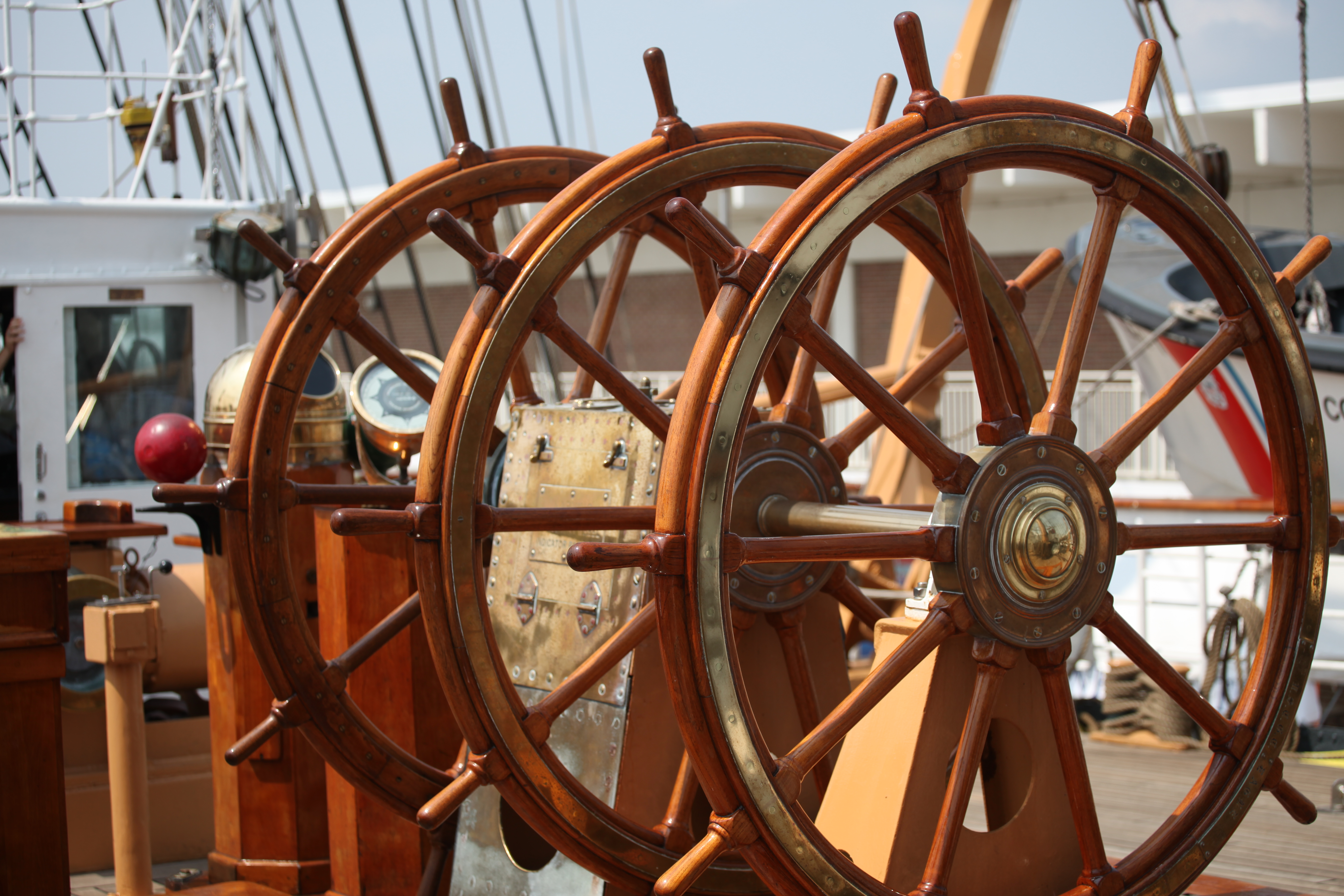
Helm station on USCGC Eagle

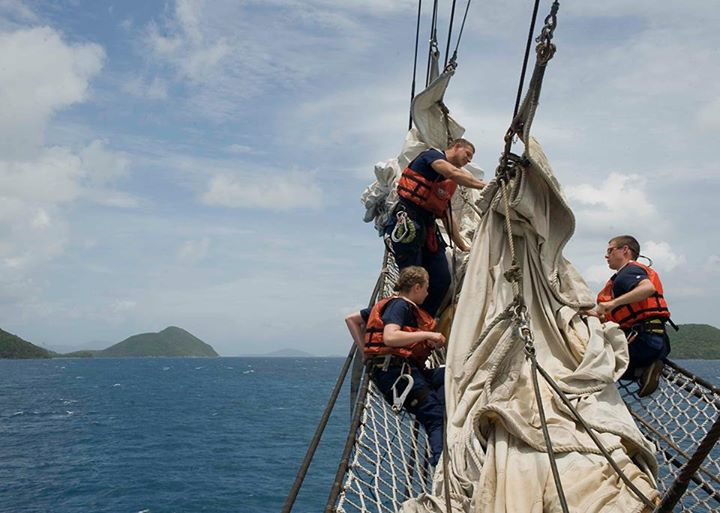
Cadets furl Eagle's jibs

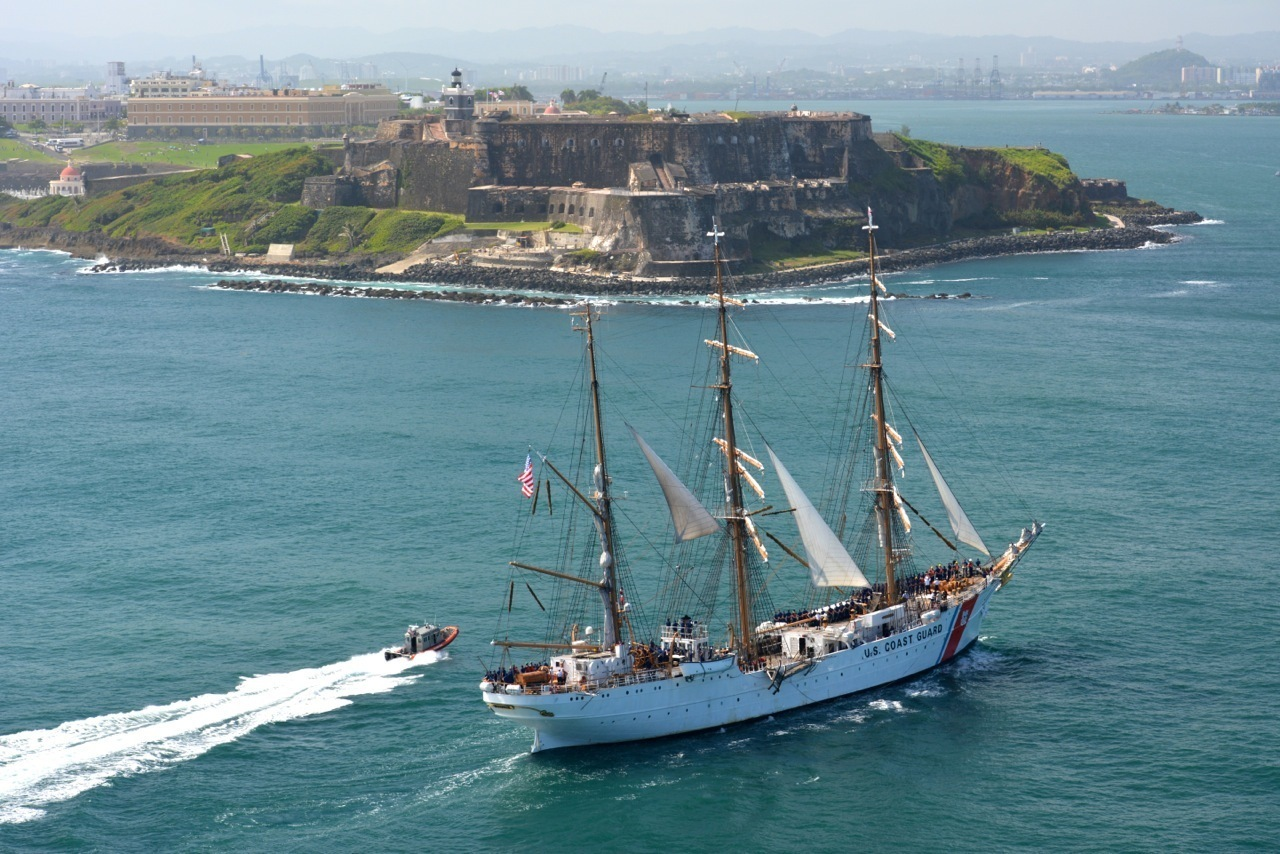
Eagle arrives in Puerto Rico

== Eagle commanding officers ==
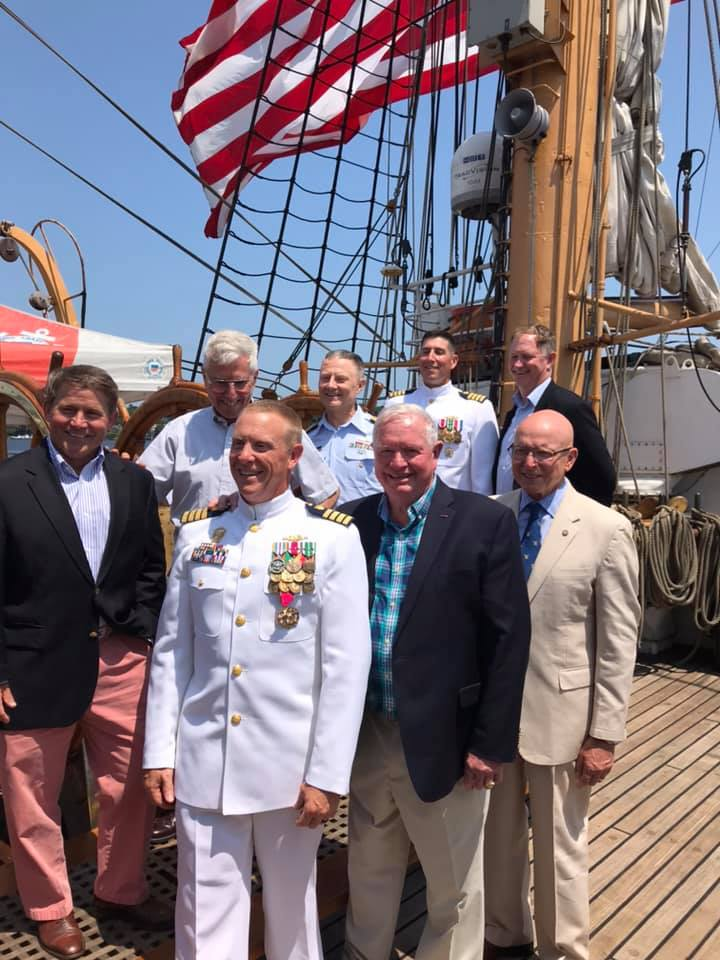
Eight Eagle COs at Eagle's 28th change of command ceremony, July 27, 2019.

Eagle's current Commander is CAPT Kristopher Ensley, a graduate of the Coast Guard Academy and a former congressional fellow. As Eagle's 32nd CO, he assumed command on 27 June 2025 from CAPT Jessica Rozzi-Ochs.

CDR Gordon P. McGowan served as the first American commanding officer of Eagle, relieving German Kapitänleutnant Berthold Schnibbe and commissioning her in the US Coast Guard as Cutter Eagle on May 15, 1946. McGowan and his crew of 6 USCG officers and 55 enlisted sailors became Eagle's plankowners, responsible for making her seaworthy for trans-Atlantic passage, and deliver her to New London with a combined American and former Horst Wessel crew who volunteered to help train the American sailors in traditional rigged sailing.

Ensley joins a distinguished list of Eagle commanders such as ADM Robert J. Papp Jr., who went on to serve as the 24th Commandant of the Coast Guard from 2010 to 2014, and VADM James C. Irwin, who served as vice commandant from 1986 to 1988. Horst Wessel's first commander, German VADM August Thiele went on to earn the Knight's Cross for his command of Kampfgruppe V.

== In popular culture ==
Eagle has a significant presence in the Nantucket series of books by S. M. Stirling, in which she is visiting the island of Nantucket when a mysterious "Event" transports the entire island, including Eagle and her crew, back in time from 17 March 1998 to the year 1250 BC. Sent across the Atlantic Ocean to barter for the grain and livestock the time-lost Nantucketers need to survive through their first winter, her arrival off the south coast of Bronze Age England leads the natives to name her crew (and, by extension, the rest of the Island's population) as 'The Eagle People'. Although the Eagle described in the books is based on the real-world ship, the named crew members are all fictional.

== Cruises by the USCGC Eagle ==
As part of its training mission, the Eagle embarks on annual cruises around the world, primarily to locations in the Americas and Europe. The following is a list of cruises conducted between 1946 and 2025.

Year	Locations
1946	Bremerhaven – Plymouth, U.K. – Azores – Bermuda – New York City – Coast Guard Academy (CGA) – Martha's Vineyard, MA – Nantucket, MA – New Bedford, MA – CGA
1947	CGA – Bermuda – Caneel Bay, VI – San Juan, PR – Nassau, Bahamas – Miami, FL – Coral Gables, FL – Parris Island, SC – Norfolk, VA – New York City – CGA
1948	CGA – Ponta Delgada, Azores – London, U.K. – Le Havre, France – Santa Cruz, Canary Islands – CGA
1949	CGA – London, U.K. – Antwerp, Belgium – Lisbon, Portugal – Casablanca, Morocco – Santa Cruz, Canary Islands – CGA
1950	CGA – Amsterdam, the Netherlands – Antwerp, Belgium – La Coruna, Spain – Lisbon, Portugal – Madeira – CGA
1951	CGA – London – Portsmouth, U.K. – Antwerp, Belgium – Amsterdam, the Netherlands – Le Havre, France – Lisbon, Portugal – Casablanca, Morocco – Canary Islands – Halifax, NS – Bermuda – CGA
1952	CGA – Oslo, Norway – Copenhagen, Denmark – Amsterdam, the Netherlands – Santander, Spain – Tenerife, Canary Islands – Bermuda – CGA
1953	CGA – Oslo, Norway – Antwerp, Belgium – Santander, Spain – Las Palmas, Canary Islands – CGA
1954	CGA – Santander, Spain – Amsterdam, the Netherlands – Copenhagen, Denmark – Bermuda – CGA
1955	CGA – Glasgow, Scotland – Le Havre, France – Lisbon, Portugal – Maderia – Bermuda – CGA
1956	CGA – San Juan, PR – Coco Solo, Panama – Havana, Cuba – Halifax, NS – CGA
1957	CGA – Bergen, Norway – London, U.K. – La Coruna, Spain – CGA
1958	CGA – Amsterdam, the Netherlands – Dublin, Ireland – Lisbon, Portugal – Halifax, NS – CGA
1959	CGA – San Juan, PR – Ciudad Trujillo, Dom. Rep. – Willemstad, Curaçao – Kingston, Jamaica – Gardiners Bay, NY – Quebec City, Quebec – Nantucket, MA – Provinceton, MA – CGA
1960	CGA – Oslo, Norway – Portsmouth, U.K – Le Havre, France – CGA
1961	CGA – Bordeaux, France – Lisbon, Portugal – Cádiz, Spain – Santa Cruz de Tenerife, Canary Islands – CGA
1962	CGA – Edinburgh, Scotland – Antwerp, Belgium – Las Palmas, Canary Islands – Washington, DC – Yorktown, VA – Bermuda – CGA
1963	CGA – Oslo, Norway – Amsterdam, the Netherlands – Santander, Spain – Funchal, Azores – Madeira – CGA
1964	CGA – San Juan, PR – Bermuda – New York City – Quebec City, Quebec – Bermuda – CGA
1965	CGA – Miami, FL – Panama City, Panama – Acapulco, Mexico – Long Beach, CA – Seattle – San Francisco, CA – San Diego, CA – CGA
1966	CGA – Wilmington, N.C. – Boston, MA – CGA
1967	CGA – Montreal, Quebec – Cape May, NJ – Providence, RI – Nantucket, MA – CGA
1968	CGA – New York City – Provincetown, MA – Portsmouth, NH – Yorktown, VA – Bermuda – CGA
1969	CGA – Norfolk, VA – New York City – Portland, ME – Newport, RI – CGA
1970	CGA – Southport, NC – Portsmouth, VA – New York City – Newport, RI – CGA
1971	CGA – Bermuda – Boston, MA – Portsmouth, NH – Newburyport, MA – CGA
1972	CGA – Mobile, AL – New Orleans, LA – Galveston, TX – Portsmouth, U.K. – Lübeck – Travemünde – Kiel, Germany^{[ger]} – Lisbon, Portugal – Madeira – CGA
1973	CGA – Boston, MA – San Juan, PR – Port Everglades, FL – Charleston, SC – New Bedford, MA – Newburyport, MA – Philadelphia, PA – CGA
1974	CGA – Washington, DC – Bermuda – Newport, RI – Boston, MA – New York City – Portsmouth, NH – New Bedford, MA – CGA
1975	CGA – Antwerp, Belgium – Le Havre, France – Rota, Spain – Funchal, Maderia – CGA
1976	CGA – Philadelphia, PA – Alexandria, VA – Bermuda – Newport, RI – New York City – Baltimore, MD – Jacksonville, FL – Miami – Charleston, SC – New Bedford, MA – CGA
1977	CGA – Hamburg, Germany – London, U.K. – Rota, Spain – CGA
1978	CGA – Guantanamo, Cuba – Cristobal, Panama – Acapulco, Mexico – San Diego, CA – Victoria, BC – Vancouver, BC – Seattle – San Francisco, CA – Long Beach, CA – CGA
1979	CGA – Halifax, NS – Norfolk, VA – Washington, DC – New York City – Bermuda – Savannah, GA – CGA
1980	CGA – Boston, MA – St. Thomas, VI – San Juan, PR – Barbados – St. Lucia – Santo Domingo, Dom. Rep. – St. Petersburg, FL – Miami, FL – Charleston, SC – CGA
1981	CGA – Cork, Ireland – Lisbon, Portugal – Rota, Spain – Malaga, Spain – Las Palmas – Canary Islands – Bermuda – New Haven, CT – CGA
1982	CGA – CGA – Washington, DC – Norfolk, VA – Philadelphia, PA – Newport, RI – New York City – Portland, ME – CGA
1983	CGA – Port of Spain, Trinidad – St. Thomas, VI – Roosevelt Roads, PR – Port Everglades, FL – Bermuda – CGA
1984	CGA – New Orleans, LA – Halifax, NS – Quebec City, Quebec – Portsmouth, NH – Bourne, MA – CGA
1985	CGA – Cape Canaveral, FL – Mobile, AL – Jacksonville, FL – Bermuda – Boston, MA – St. Pierre et Miquelon – New Bedford, MA – Gloucester, MA – CGA
1986	CGA – Yorktown, VA – Bermuda – Washington, DC – Bermuda – Norfolk, VA – New York City – Halifax, NS – Newport, RI – Newport, RI – Portland, ME – Portsmouth, NH – CGA
1987	CGA – CGA – New York City – CGA – Fall River, MA – New Bedford, MA – Palm Beach, FL – Rodman, Panama – Guyaquil, Ecuador – Galapagos, Ecuador – Papette, Tahiti – Bora Bora/Society Islands/Pago Pago, Am. Samoa – Apia, Western Samoa – Nukualofa, Tonga – Vav'u, Tonga – Newcastle/Australia – Brisbane, QLD, Australia^{[aus]}
1988	Hobart, TAS – Sydney, NSW – Pago Pago, American Samoa – Honolulu, HI – Seattle, WA – San Francisco, CA – Long Beach, CA – Acapulco, Mexico – Rodman, Panama – Miami, FL – Edinburgh, Scotland – Bergen, Norway – Hamburg, Germany – Antwerp, Belgium – Santa Cruz, Canary Islands – Bermuda – CGA
1989	CGA – New York City – London, UK – Cork, Ireland – Leningrad, USSR – Aalborg, Denmark – Horseus, Denmark – Helsinki, Finland – Rouen, France – Horta, Azores – Halifax, NS – Portland, ME – Washington, DC – Savannah, GA – Yorktown, VA – CGA
1990	CGA – Tampa, FL – Mobile, AL – New Orleans, LA – Wilmington, NC – Washington, DC – Norfolk, VA – Portsmouth, VA – Charleston, SC – New York City – Boothbay Harbor, ME – Boston, MA – Kennebunkport, ME – Philadelphia, PA – Baltimore, MD – Fall River, MA – Newport, RI – Portsmouth, NH – Halifax, NS – CGA
1991	CGA – Yorktown, VA – Ponta Delgada, Azores – Cherbourg, France – Weymouth, UK – Lisbon, Portugal – Funchal, Maderia – Bermuda – Gloucester, MA – Washington, DC – CGA
1992	CGA – Roosevelt Roads, PR – San Juan, PR – Nassau, Bahamas – New York City – Boston – Newport, RI – Portland, ME – Norfolk, VA – Morehead City, NC – Savannah, GA – CGA
1993	CGA – Dublin, Ireland – Oporto, Portugal – Cádiz, Spain – Funchal, Madeira – Bermuda – CGA
1994	CGA – Baltimore, MD – Washington, DC – Ponta Delgada, Azores – Plymouth, UK – Rouen, France – Bermuda – Newport, RI – CGA
1995	CGA – New York City – Norfolk, VA – CGA – Portsmouth, NH – Halifax, NS – Louisbourg, NS – Fall River, MA – CGA
1996	CGA – Dublin, Ireland – Amsterdam, the Netherlands – Hamburg, Germany^{[50]} – Rostock, Germany – St. Petersburg, Russia – Helsinki, Finland – London, UK – Portsmouth, UK – Ponta Delgada, Azores – St. George, Bermuda – CGA
1997	CGA – Plymouth, UK – Copenhagen, Denmark – Den Helder, The Netherlands – Bermuda – Norfolk, VA – CGA
1998	CGA – Roosevelt Roads, PR – Martinique, French Antilles – La Guaira, Venezuela – Cartagena, Colombia – CGA – New York City – Washington, DC – San Juan, PR – Miami – Savannah, GA – Boston, MA – Halifax, NS – Portland, ME – CGA
1999	CGA – Panama Canal – Acapulco, Mexico – San Francisco, CA – Portland, OR – San Diego, CA – Panama Canal – CGA
2000	CGA – Savannah, GA – Bermuda – San Juan, PR – Miami, FL – Norfolk, VA – CGA – New York City – CGA – Halifax, NS – Portland, ME – Newport, RI – Gloucester, MA – CGA – Boston, MA – CGA
2001	CGA – St. Johns, NF – Cork, Ireland – Brest, France – Lisbon, Portugal – Gilbraltar – Bermuda – Norfolk, VA – New Bedford, MA – Fall River, MA – CGA – Greenpoint, NY – CGA
2002	CGA – New York City – Washington, DC – Nassau, Bahamas – Ft. Lauderdale, FL – Mobile, AL – Key West, FL – Charleston, SC – Norfolk, VA – Salem, MA – Boston, MA – Salem, MA – Halifax, NS – CGA
2003	CGA – Halifax, NS – CGA – Bermuda – Antiqua – San Juan, PR – Trinidad – St. Maarten – Santo Domingo, Dom. Rep. Wilmington, NC – Norfolk, VA – Annapolis, MD – Philadelphia, PA – Portland, ME – CGA
2004	CGA – Port Canaveral, FL – CGA – New York City – Savannah, GA – Key West, FL – Dry Tortugas – Fort Jefferson, FL – Nassau, Bahamas – Jacksonville, FL – Charleston, SC – Hamilton, Bermuda – Boston, MA – Newport, RI – CGA – Rockland, ME – Halifax, NS – Saint John, NB – CGA – Portland, ME – CGA – Curtis Bay, MD
2005	CGA – Curtis Bay, MD – Little Creek, VA – Morehead City, NC – CGA – St. Johns, NF – Bremerhaven, Germany^{[brv]} – Edinburgh, Scotland – Portsmouth, UK – Waterford, Ireland – Cherbough, France – Lisbon, Portugal – Rota, Spain – Madeira – Tenerife, Canary Islands – Hamilton, Bermuda – CGA
2006	CGA – Little Creek, VA – Savannah, GA – CGA – New York City – Washington, DC – Norfolk, VA – New London, CT – Hamilton, Bermuda – San Juan, PR – Charleston, SC – Newport, RI – Portsmouth, NH – Boston, MA – Greenport, NY – Halifax, NS – CGA
2007	CGA – San Juan, PR – Barbados – St. Maarten – San Juan, PR – Caribbean ports – Norfolk, VA – CGA
2008	CGA – Mazatlan, MEX – Victoria, BC – Tacoma, WA – Astoria, OR – San Francisco, CA – Los Angeles, CA – San Diego, CA – Panama City, Panama – CGA
2009	CGA – Little Creek, VA – Charleston, SC – Hamilton, Bermuda – Rota, ESP – Cassis, FRA – Monaco, Monaco – Halifax, CAN – Portsmouth, NH – Portland, ME – Rockland, ME – Boston, MA – CGA
2010	CGA – Savannah, GA – San Juan, PR – Willemstad, Curaçao – Cartagena, COL – Cozumel, MEX – Veracruz, MEX – Corpus Christi, TX – Tampa, FL – Fort Lauderdale, FL – Wilmington, NC – CGA
2011	CGA – Waterford, IRE – Hamburg, GER^{[75]} – London, UK – Reykjavik, IS – Halifax, CAN – Boston, MA – New Bedford, MA – New York, NY – CGA
2012	CGA – New Orleans, LA – Jacksonville, FL – Savannah, GA – New York, NY – Norfolk, VA – Baltimore, MD – Boston, MA – CGA – Halifax, CAN – Portland, ME – Newport, RI – CGA
2013	CGA – Savannah, GA – Charleston, SC – Tortola, BVI – Guantanamo, Cuba – Oranjestad, Aruba – St Petersberg, FL – Hamilton, Bermuda – St Pierre, FR – Halifax, CAN – Portsmouth, RI – Boston, MA – CGA
2014	CGA – Morehead City, NC – San Juan, PR – Oranjestad, Aruba – Cozumel, MEX – Miami, FL – Sydney, CAN – St Johns, CAN – New York, NY – Bourne, MA – Rockland, ME – Yorkyown, VA – Baltimore, MD (USCG YARD^{[cgy]})
2015	USCG YARD – Key West, FL – Nassau, Bahamas – Norfolk, VA – Staten Island, NY – Philadelphia, PA – Hamilton, Bermuda – Boston, MA – Newport, RI – New York, NY – CGA – Portsmouth, VA – USCG YARD
2016	USCG YARD – Little Creek, VA – Savannah, GA – Charleston, SC – Hamilton, Bermuda – Madeira, POR – Dublin, IRE – London, UK – Salem, MA – CGA – New York, NY – Norfolk, VA – USCG YARD
2017	USCG YARD – Little Creek, VA – CGA – Hamilton, Bermuda – Port Canaveral, FL – Norfolk, VA – Boston, MA – Charlottetown, PEI – Quebec, CAN – Halifax, CAN – Portland, ME – New York, NY – Alexandria, VA – USCG YARD
2018	USCG YARD – Little Creek, VA – Portsmouth, VA – Yorktown, VA – Newport, RI – CGA – St Thomas, USVA – Bridgetown, Barbados – Santo Domingo, DR – San Juan, PR – Roatán, HND – Cartagena, COL – Willemstad, Curaçao – Miami, FL – Norfolk, VA – New Bedford, MA – CGA – USCG YARD
2019	USCG YARD – Savannah, GA – Portsmouth, UK – Oslo, NO – Kiel, GER – Copenhagen, DEN – Antwerp, BE – Rouen, FRA – Scheveningen, NLD – Ponta Delgada, Azores – Hamilton, Bermuda – Portsmouth, NH – Salem, MA – New York, NY – CGA
2020	CGA – CGA^{[c19]}
2021	CGA – Azores, POR – Reykjavik, IS – Hamilton, Bermuda – CGA – Newport, RI – Portland, ME – CGA – Portsmouth, VA – CGA
2022	CGA – Charleston, SC – CGA – Miami, FL – Pensacola, FL – Galveston, TX – Key West, FL – Hamilton, Bermuda – CGA – Boston – New York City – CGA
2023	CGA – Punta Delgao, Azores – Den Helder, NLD – Oslo, NOR – Helsinki, FIN – Stockholm, SE – Aalborg, DK – Funchal, Madeira – Hamilton, BER – New York, NY – Portland, ME – CGA
2024	CGA – Santo Domingo, DR – Cartagena, COL – San Juan, PR – Bridgetown, BMU – Halifax, NS – Portsmouth, NH – Rockland, ME – Boston, MA – CGA
2025	CGA – Puntarenas, CR – Puerto Vallarta, MEX – Los Angeles, CA – Portland, OR – Astoria, OR – San Francisco, CA – Victoria, BC – Seattle, WA – San Francisco, CA – Los Angeles, CA – San Diego, CA – Panama City, PAN – CGA

=== Notes ===
^{[ger]}Eagle's first visit to Germany following the end of WWII
^{[aus]}First visit to Oceania in honor of Australia's Bicentennial
^{[50]} 50th Anniversary return to Blohm & Voss shipyard in Hamburg, Germany
^{[brv]} First visit to Horst Wessel's final homeport of Bremerhaven since the end of WW2
^{[75]} 75th Anniversary return to Blohm & Voss shipyard in Hamburg, Germany
^{[cgy]} Wintered at USCG Yard in Baltimore for 5 year refit period
^{[c19]}Cadet cruises were prohibited from making any port calls due to the COVID-19 pandemic

== See also ==
- Gorch Fock (1958), training ship of the German Navy
- Kiel Week
- List of large sailing vessels
- NRP Sagres, Gorch Fock I, and Mircea, sister ships to Eagle

== General and cited references ==
- Drumm, Russell (2001). The Barque of Saviors: Eagle's Passage from the Nazi Navy to the US Coast Guard. Boston: Houghton Mifflin. ISBN 978-0-395-98367-6.
- Holtkamp, Tido (2008). A Perfect Lady: A Pictorial History of the U.S. Coast Guard Barque Eagle. Mystic, CT: Flat Hammock Press. ISBN 978-0-9795949-2-2.
- Jones, Eric C.; Nolan, Christopher D. (2011). Eagle Seamanship: A Manual for Square-Rigger Sailing (4th ed.). Annapolis, MD: Naval Institute Press. ISBN 978-1-59114-631-5.
- McGowan, Gordon (1998). The Skipper & the Eagle (2nd ed.). Peekskill, NY: Sea History Press, National Maritime Historical Soc. ISBN 978-0-930248-09-3.
