= Chafing (nautical) =

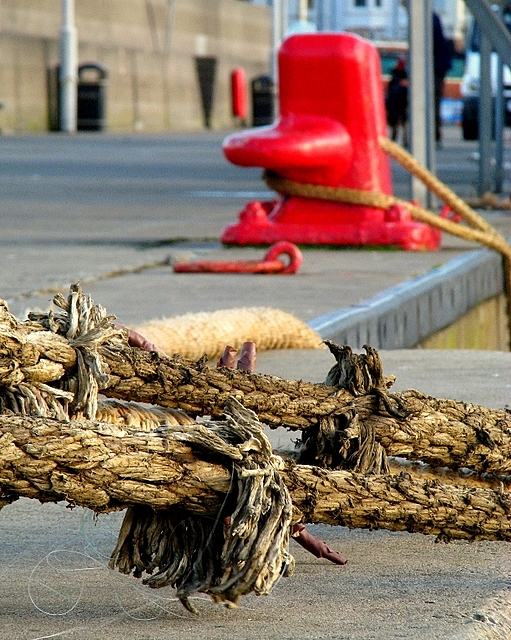
Chafed mooring lines

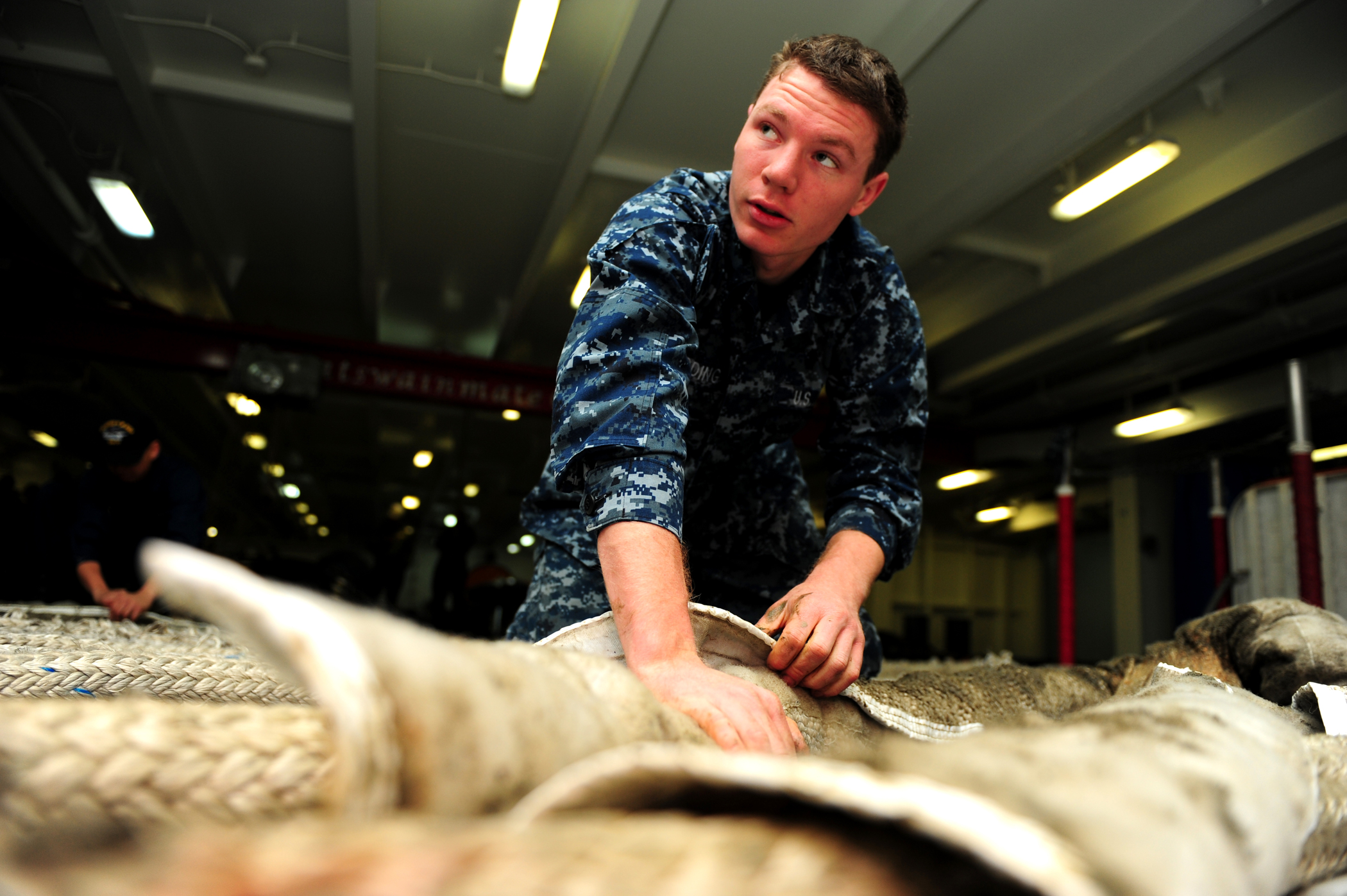
Guards can be applied to mooring lines to prevent this

In sailing, chafing is the process of wear on a line, sail or yard caused by constant rubbing and fretting. Various methods are used to prevent chafing, such as employing chafing gear or shifting halyards to move their wear-point. Chafing of lines that rest on a chock on a boat can be prevented by putting a protecting material around the line. Traditionally ropes were wrapped in canvas and lubricated with tallow; however, plastic sleeves or pipes (sometimes as simple as a piece of old garden hose) are more common in recent times. Chafing of a sail rubbing against a cable can be prevented on large ships by tying a baggywrinkle around the cable.
