= Baggywrinkle =

Sailing ship component

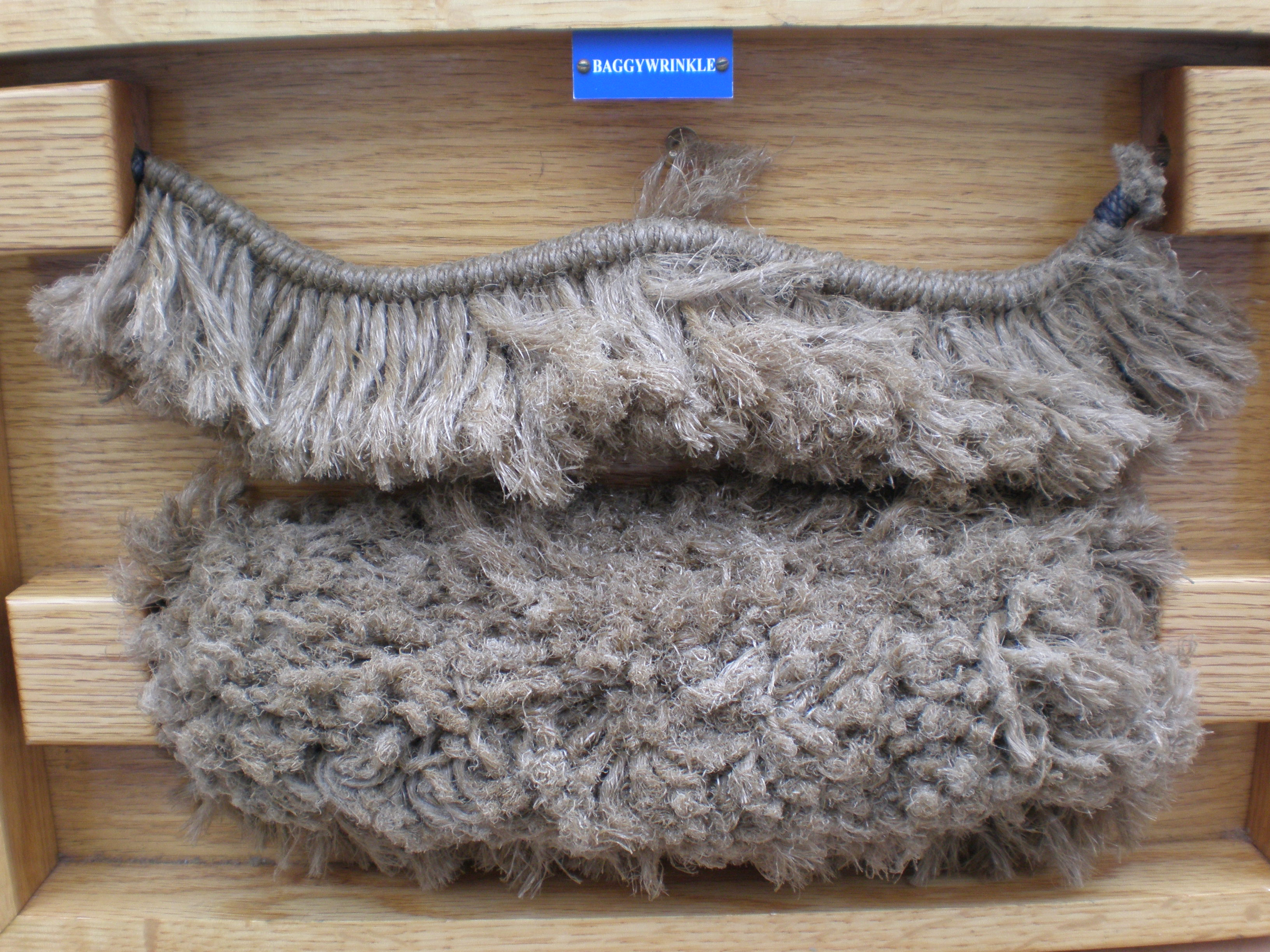
A sample of baggywrinkle

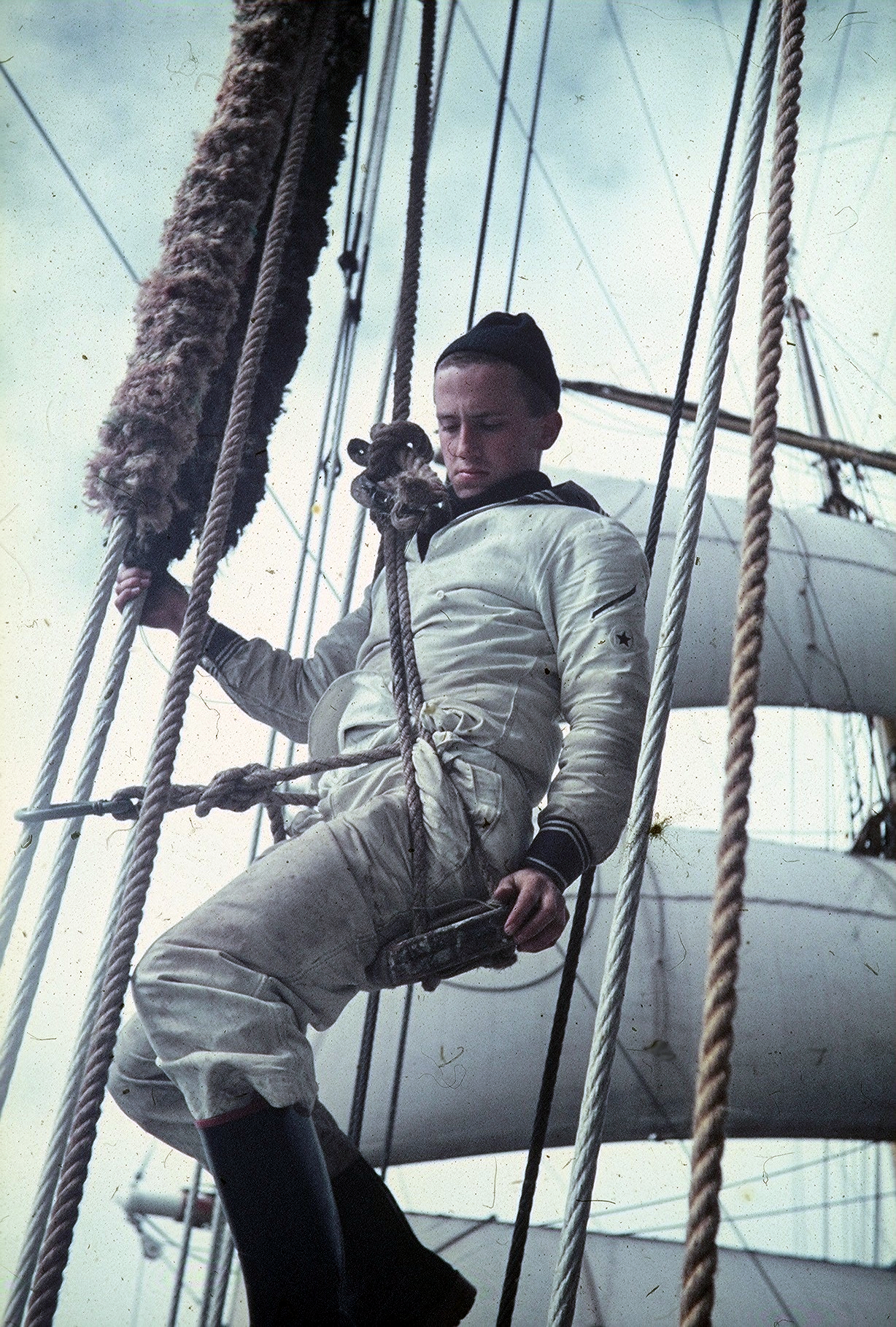
Baggywrinkle covering rigging on Gorch Fock

Baggywrinkle is a soft covering for cables (or any other obstructions) to reduce sail chafe. There are many points in the rig of a large sailing ship where the sails come into contact with the standing rigging; unprotected sails would soon develop holes at the points of contact. Baggywrinkle provides a softer wearing surface for the sail.

Baggywrinkle is made from short pieces of yarn cut from old lines that have been taken out of service. Two parallel lengths of marline are stretched between fixed points, and the lengths of yarn are attached using a hitch called a "railroad sennit". This creates a long, shaggy fringe which, when the marline is wound around a cable, becomes a large hairy cylinder.

== See also ==
- Spreader patch
- Stanchion patch
