= Spreader patch =

A spreader patch is a fabric reinforcement at a point on a sail where it is likely to rub with the spreader on a mast.

== Use and construction ==
Spreader patches may be placed on a jib, when it overlaps with the mast, or on the mainsail, where it may interfere when furled, or when the sail is backwinded against the mast. Patches may be made of tape, sticky-backed Dacron, or other material that is compatible with the type of sailcloth being reinforced. When applying such patches, it's important to affix it starting from the inner part of the sail, towards the edge of the sail (leech).
