= Spanish bowline =

Knot

Spanish Bowline
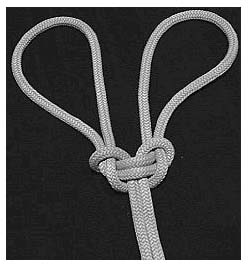
- Category: Loop
- Related: Portuguese bowline
- Typical use: Lifting a person
- ABoK: #1087

The Spanish bowline is a double loop knot that can be used to lift a person. For a conscious person, each loop is placed around a leg and the person holds onto the standing part of the rope. This knot can serve as a makeshift Bosun's chair. For an unconscious person one loop is placed around the arm pits and the second loop is placed around the knees.

This knot has an elegant symmetry and can be tied quickly when mastered. Unlike the Portuguese bowline, each loop is separately fixed, which is a nice feature. It is a complicated knot however and if not properly tightened, it can slip. A fireman's chair knot is another double loop knot which is more practical, easier to tie and less prone to slipping although it lacks the elegance of a Spanish bowline.

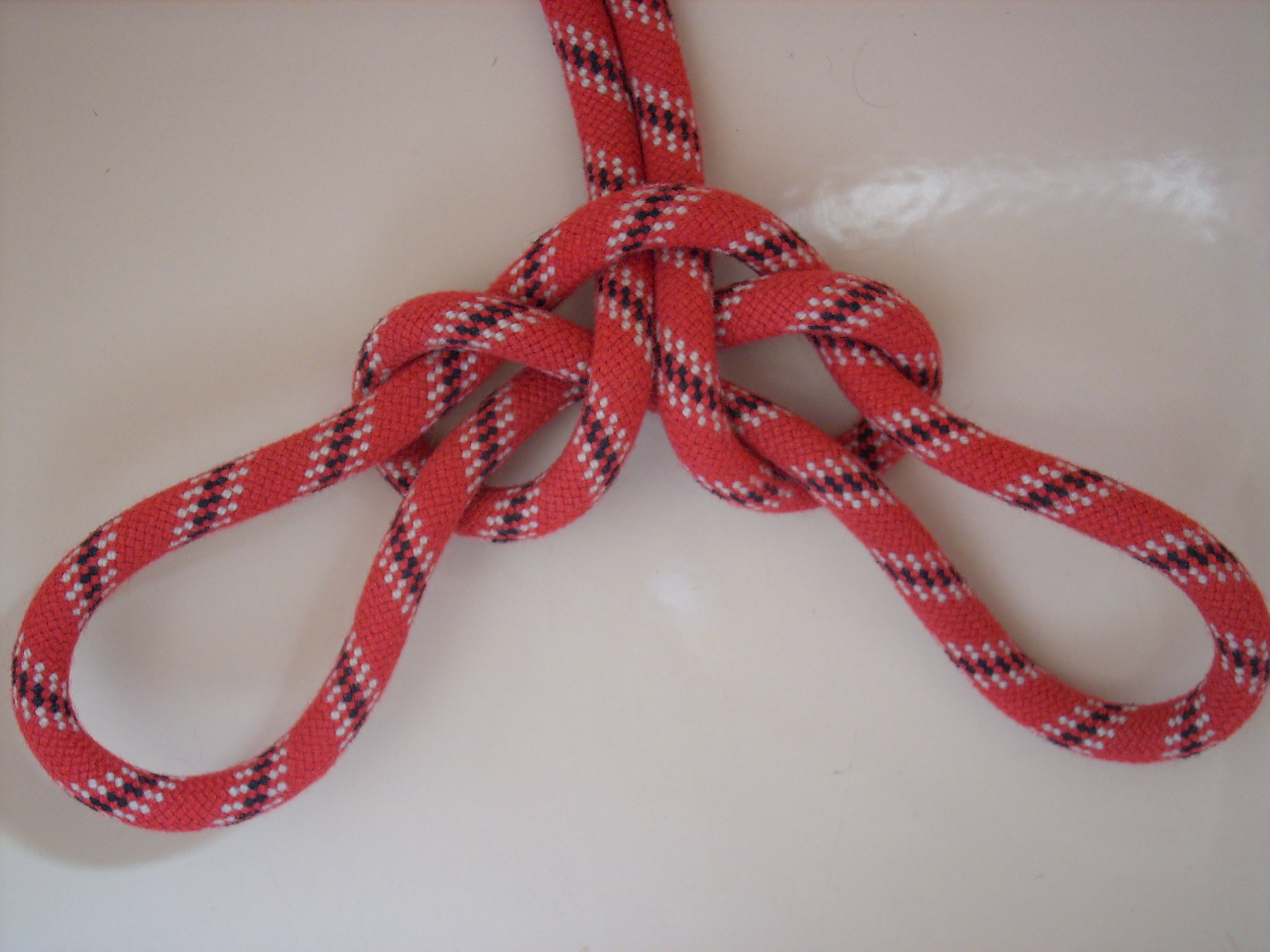
From behind

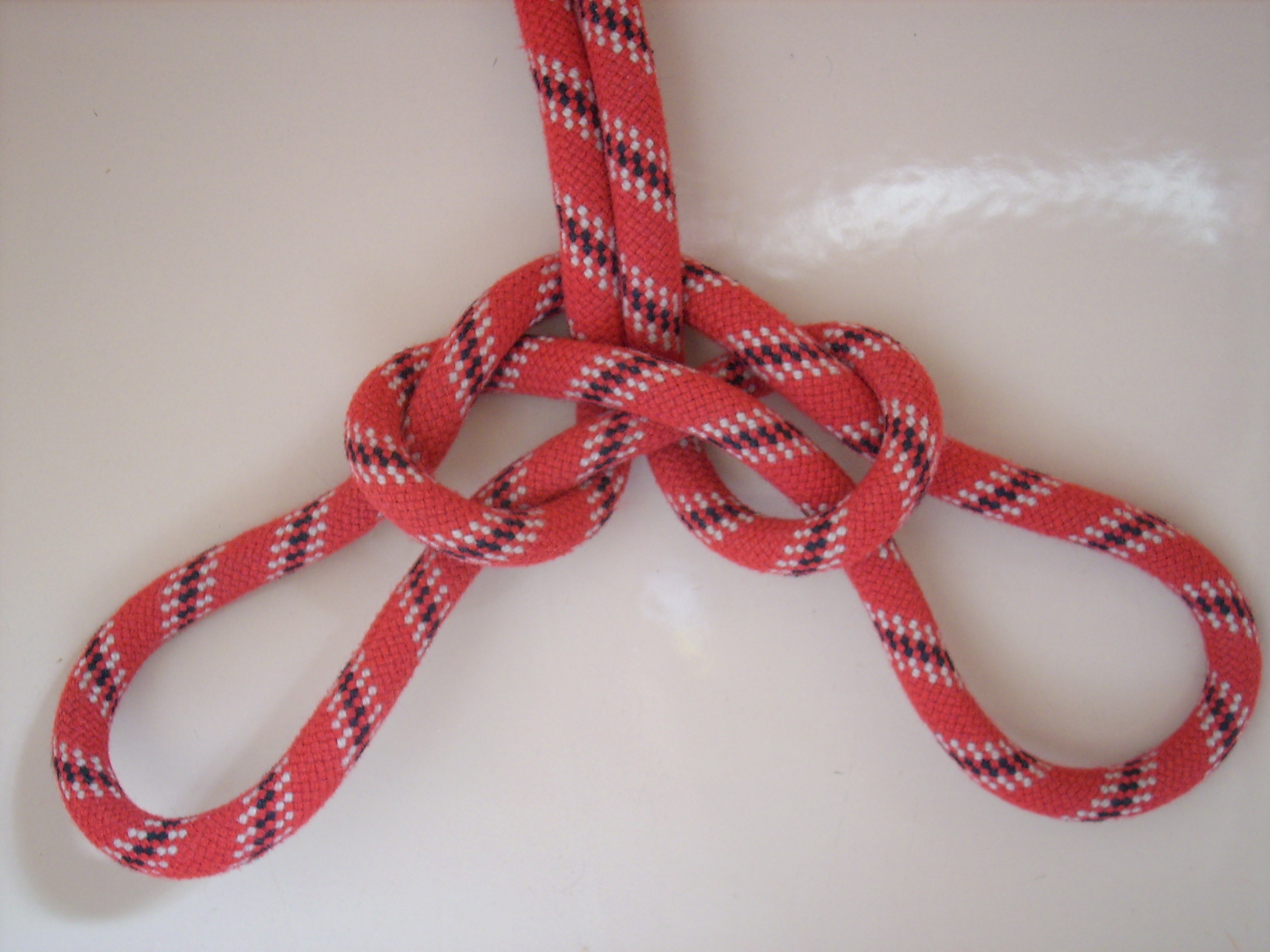
From the front

== See also ==
- List of knots
