= Portuguese bowline =

Type of knot

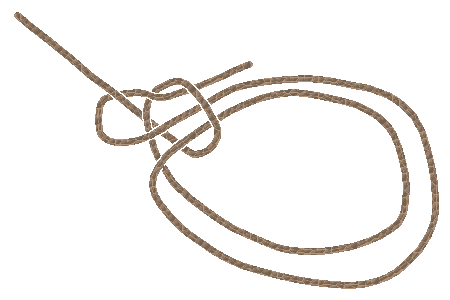
- Category: Loop
- Related: Spanish bowline
- Typical use: Boat tow, Bosun's chair, Double anchor, Litter bridle
- ABoK: #1072, #1848
- Instructions: see external links

The Portuguese bowline (Portuguese: Nó volta do calafate), also known as the Bowline on a coil, Caulker's bowline, or Lisbon surprise, is a variant of the bowline with two loops. The two loops are adjustable in size. Rope can be pulled from one loop into the other, even after tightening. Among other applications, the knot can be used as an equalising anchor, a litter bridle or a makeshift Bosun's chair. It is often regarded as one of the more important bowline variations.

== Name ==
It is sometimes known as the French bowline, not to be confused with the separate French bowline, thanks to its description under that name in the 1922 book Standard Seamanship for the Merchant Service by Felix Riesenberg, as Riesenberg had been taught the knot by a French sailor in the voyage he described in Under Sail. The traditional name of this knot is Portuguese bowline.

== Tying ==
It is tied in a way that is similar to regular bowlines.

Click on a picture to see its full-size version.

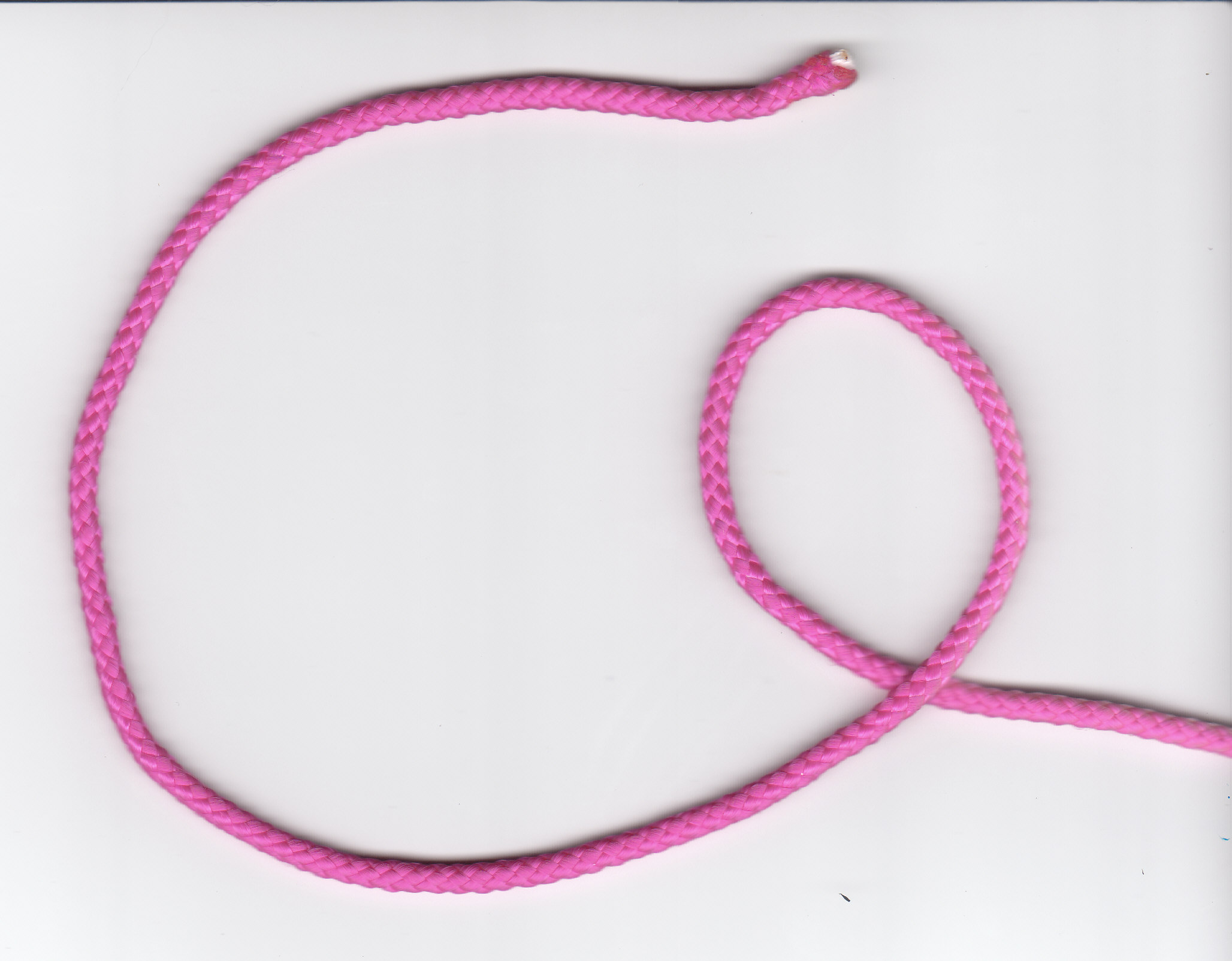
Make an overhand loop (loop with the working end on top).

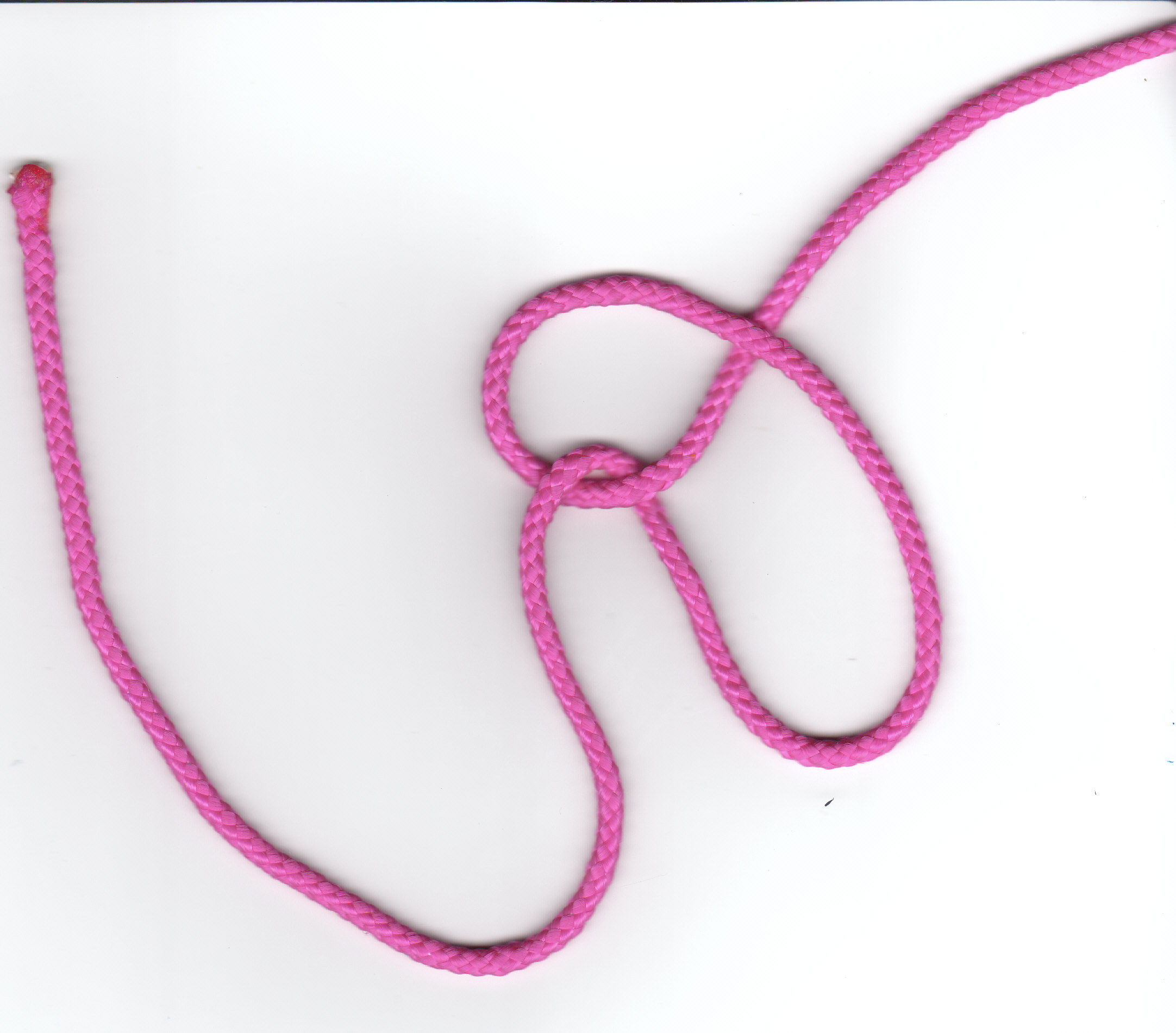
Put the working end through the loop.

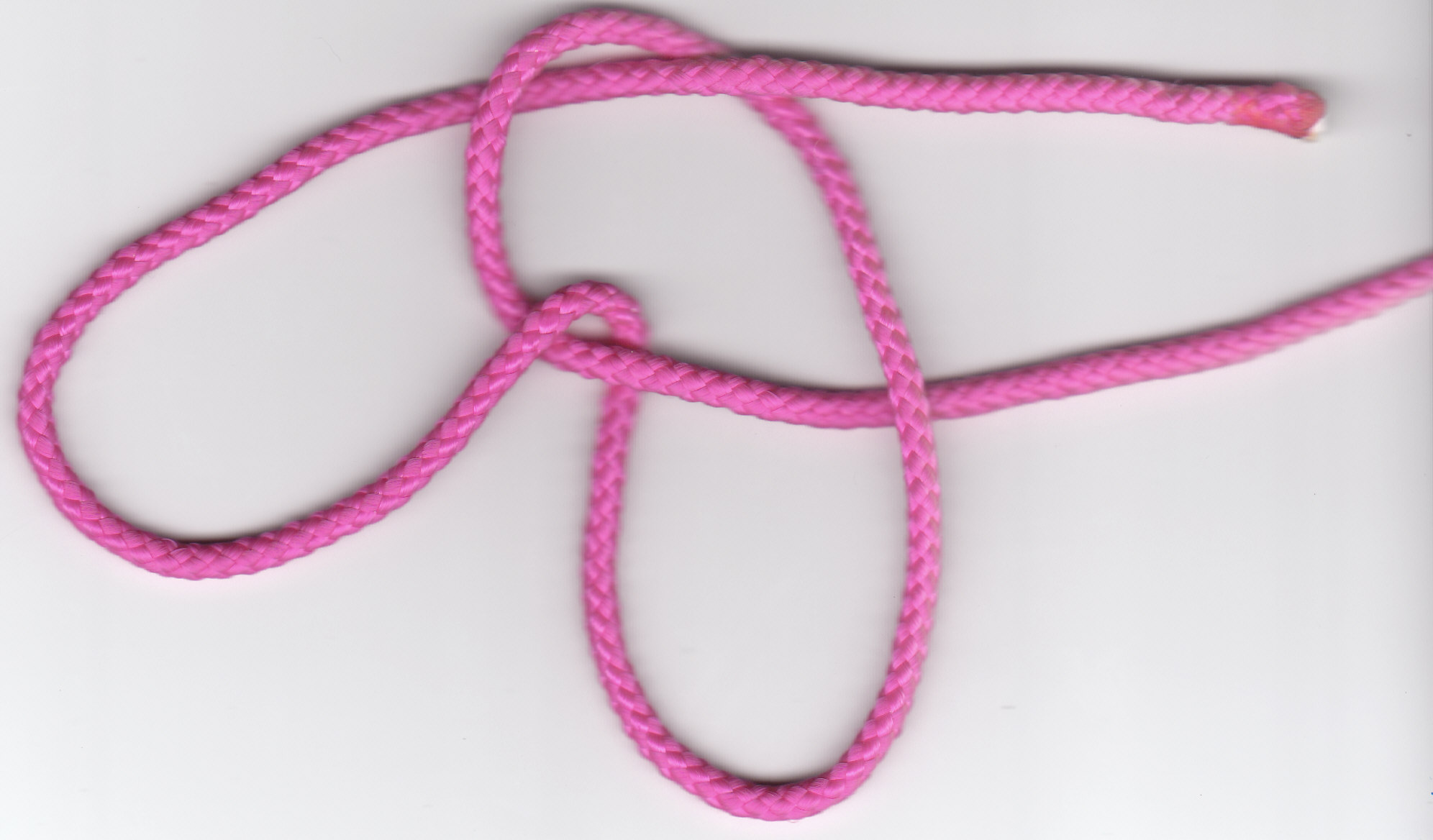
Put it through again. From here, the steps are the same as the regular bowline.

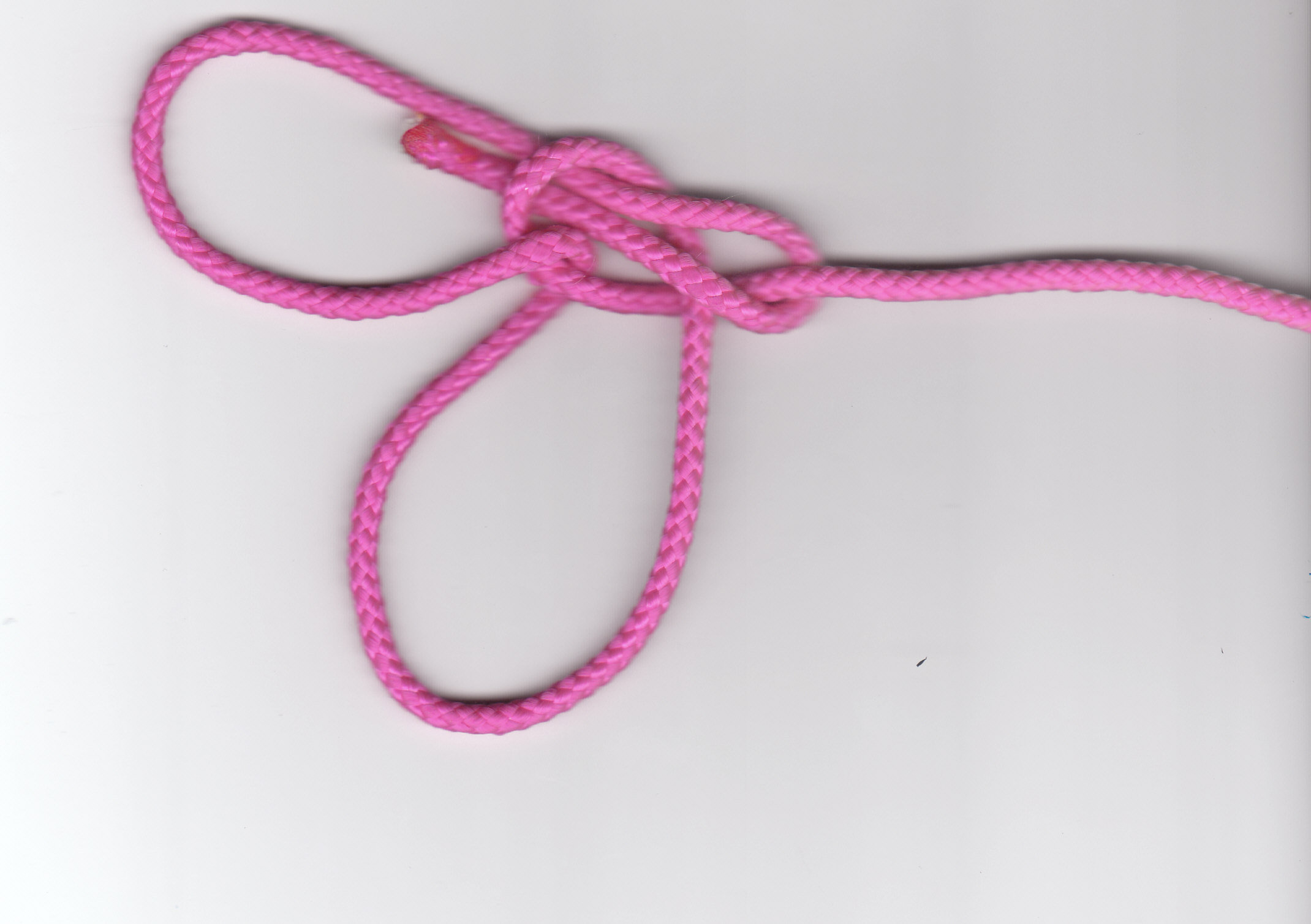
Put it around the standing end and back through the loop.

== Variants ==
The knot is often tied in the bight by sailors, rescuers, and others. ABoK #1083, earlier depicted by Hjalmar Öhrvall, is an example of a Portuguese bowline on a bight.

Other times it is tied with a follow through, that is, the knot is retraced.

A No-twist variant is sometimes tied for specific applications. Other variants involve method of tying.

== Uses ==
Among arborists, in rescue, and other vertical professions, it is frequently used alongside knots like the equalising eight in two-point anchors.

It originated as a sailing knot and is still frequently used in sailing. Its most common application in sailing was to substitute for a Bosun's chair, but at the risk of suspension trauma. It is still used to tow boats. Similar horizontal load applications exist beyond sailing.

It is used in search and rescue both to form a litter tag. and in some cases the litter bridle itself.

It can be used to make a hanging bike rack.

== Strength ==
In a 2019 slop pull test, the Portuguese bowline on a bight with Yosemite finish failed on an 11 mm high tenacity polyester rope at a minimum of 36.9 kN when it was pulled from its anchors into a forward facing bight, and on an 8 mm nylon cord at a minimum of 9.6 kN (only 9.1 kN without the Yosemite finish).

== See also ==
- List of knots
