= Ruffles and flourishes =

Fanfare for ceremonial music played on drums and bugles

Four ruffles and flourishes played before "Hail Columbia"
U.S. military band playing ruffles and flourishes being before a performance of "Hail Columbia"

Ruffles and flourishes are short musical sequences sometimes played in ceremonial situations.

== By country ==
=== Israel ===
In the Israeli Defense Forces, ruffles and flourishes are sounded as a guard of honor presents arms to signify the honors music that will follow. Depending on the status of the person receiving the honors, they will receive between one and three ruffles and flourishes in the honor of the recipient.

- President of Israel, foreign dignitaries: 3 ruffles and flourishes
- Prime minister of Israel, members of the Knesset: 2 ruffles and flourishes
- Cabinet members: 1 ruffle and flourish

=== Italy ===
Italy uses ruffles and flourishes, particularly at ceremonies where the raising of the Italian national flag takes place. The music that is sounded is known as "Onori" ("Honors") and is played usually before the performance of an abridged version of "Il Canto degli Italiani".

=== South Korea ===
South Korea uses ruffles and flourishes, with a total of four played before the South Korean national anthem, or the "Phoenix Hymn", which is the official honors music for the president of South Korea.

=== Philippines ===
The official ruffles and flourishes for the president of the Philippines is played four times before the playing of "Lupang Hinirang" or "Parangal sa Pangulo" (English: "Honorable Salute to the President"). During military events, the ruffles and flourishes are sounded alongside a 21-gun artillery salute.

=== United States ===
Four ruffles and flourishes (the maximum in the U.S.) played by a U.S. military band in 1994 before the dual South African national anthems. In the U.S. ruffles and flourishes are often played before national anthems, whether of the U.S. or other countries, as part of official ceremonies.

U.S. ruffles are played on drums, and flourishes are played on bugles. The president of the United States receives four ruffles and flourishes before "Hail to the Chief" and the vice president of the United States receives four ruffles and flourishes before "Hail, Columbia". In the U.S., four ruffles and flourishes is the maximum number played. Four ruffles and flourishes are played before national anthems, whether of the U.S. or foreign countries. General officers and admirals receive ruffles and flourishes equal to the number of stars they have, and then "General's March" or "Admiral's March" is played.

Although roughly equivalent, the United States Navy has a different "Table of Honors" – some civilian officials more, others less; often different musical tunes – and includes in its arsenal of formal Honors one more, which is specific to naval traditions: sideboys, an even number of seamen (in this list eight for guests with quadruple or triple ruffles and flourishes, six for lower ranking dignitaries) posted at the gangway when the dignitary boards or leaves the ship, historically to help (or even hoist) him aboard, currently as a ceremonial sort of guard of honor.

=== Vatican City ===
Vatican City also uses ruffles and flourishes during the newly elected pope's first public appearance and follows the abridged version of Inno e Marcia Pontificale and 2-line version of the Italian national anthem and the Inno e Marcia Pontificale is repeated with preceding ruffles and flourishes. The newly elected pope delivers after a thanksgiving address.

Ruffles and flourishes are also used during the two Urbi et Orbi addresses during Easter Sunday and Christmas.

== See also ==
- 21-gun salute
- Military honors
- Military band
- Military drum
