= Sideboy =

Ceremonial maritime role for visiting dignitaries

Side boy
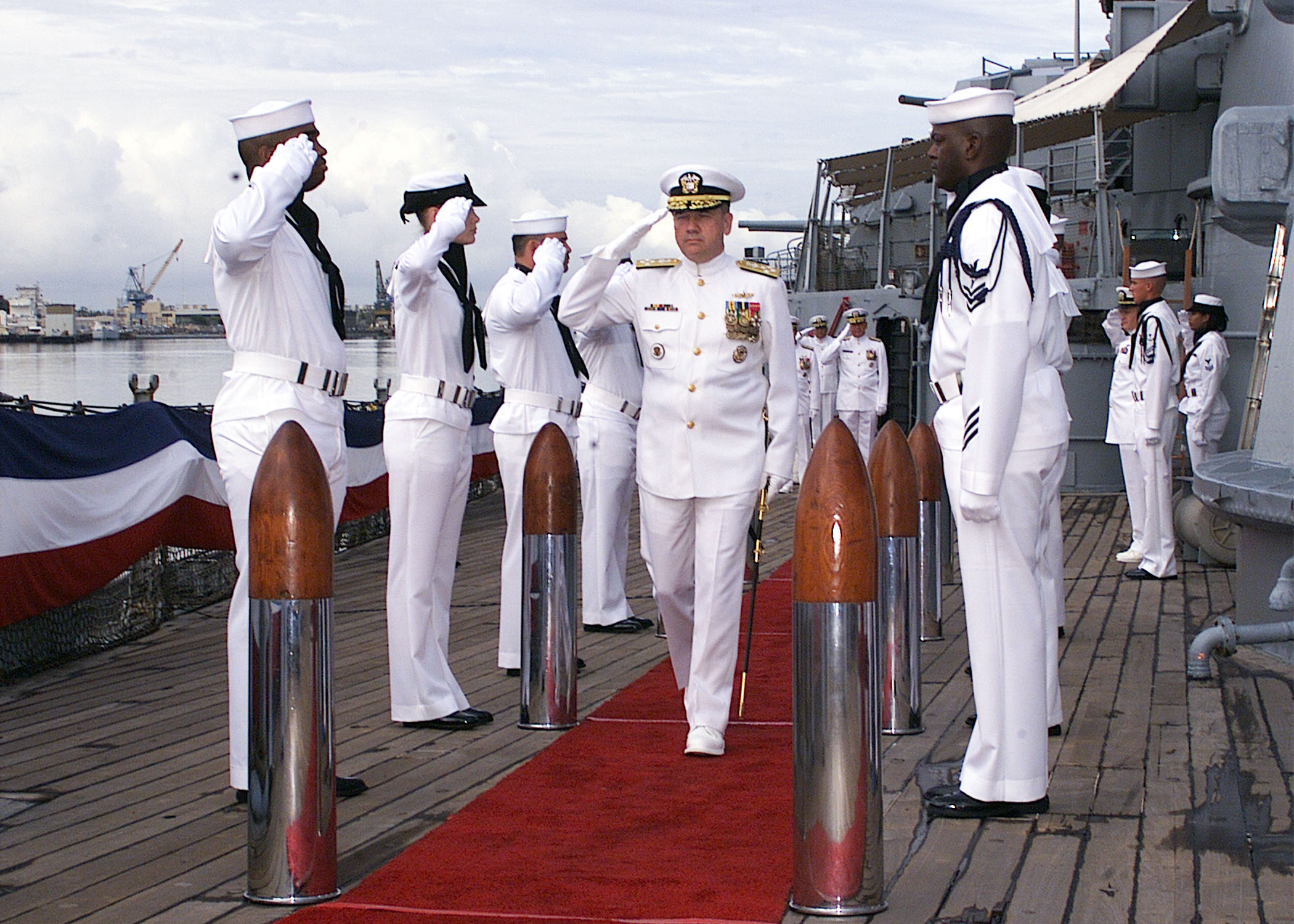
- Side boys render honors to ADM Doran aboard USS Missouri

General
- Department: Deck department
- Reports to: Boatswain's mate
- Location: Quarterdeck
- Duties: Rendering side honors to visiting officials aboard a ship

Side boys are a naval tradition to welcome and send off dignitaries as they board and depart a Navy ship. Side boys are now also used for other ceremonial purposes on land such as during a change of command or retirement. They can be composed of either male or female members of the ship's crew, and act under the command of a Boatswain's mate, who gives commands with their pipe.

== History ==
Pipe Aboard/the Side

In the age of sail, ships often couldn't come into smaller ports without risking getting stuck in the shallow water, and would anchor out in deeper water, taking the ships' boats back and forth from shore. Crew and cargo would either climb up a rope ladder or get hoisted up over the side. Climbing up a ladder wasn't very dignified, and even younger dignitaries who were able to climb a ladder often found themselves unaccustomed to the flexibility of the ladder, so 2 crew members were provided to assist those individuals safely aboard. Older dignitaries, who tended to be less agile would be hoisted aboard in a boatswain's chair. They also tended to be better fed than the average civilian and required more men to hoist them aboard, so the practice of assigning more men to assist senior dignitaries became common practice.

The Boatswain's mate would signal to the line of men heaving the boatswain's chair aboard to "hoist away" or "avast heaving" with their pipe, and those signals and the ceremonial line of men on either side of the gangway now serve as a nautical courtesy for distinguished guests. The U.S. Navy provides this courtesy for any distinguished visitor, whether civilian or from another service, while the Royal Navy reserves the full ceremony for Naval Officers only.

== U.S. Navy protocol today ==
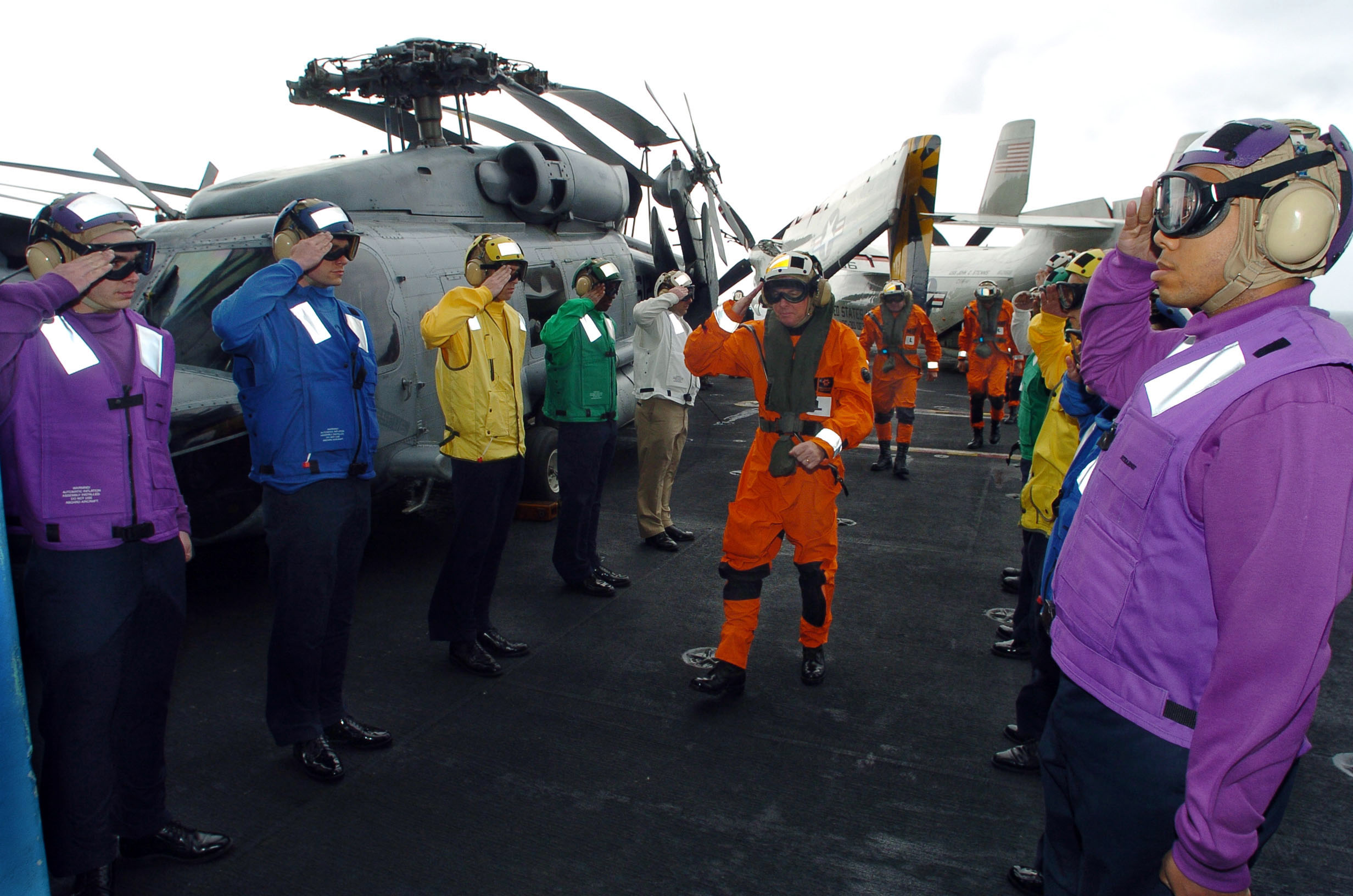
Rainbow side boys welcome ADM Fargo aboard Stennis

Side boys today are an even-numbered group of seamen posted facing each other in two rows at the head of the brow when a visiting dignitary boards or leaves the ship, the number dependent on the rank or seniority of the guest. The boatswain's mate should be positioned behind the outboard side boy in the forward row but where convenient as space allows. Some dignitaries, such as the President of the United States, Secretary of the Navy, Admirals, or a U.S. Ambassador while making a port call in a foreign country, warrant additional honors such as gun salutes, ruffles and flourishes, and an honor guard.

When dignitaries arrive aboard the flight deck via aircraft on a carrier, the flight deck crew serve as sideboys wearing their colored flight deck jerseys, and are known as "rainbow side boys."

The protocol for arrivals and departures are as follows:

Side Honors

OPNAVINST 1710.12

Side Honors:

- The Ship's bell is rung in groups of two corresponding to the number of side boys to which the officer is entitled.
- The officer of the deck announces the officer’s title (ie: SECDEF, PACFLT, Ship Name, Fleet Training Center), followed by "arriving" or "departing".
- A visiting Navy officer who is not an operational commander is announced by his or her rank and service; for example, Captain, U.S. Navy, Colonel, U.S. Army.
- A party consisting of more than one officer or official entitled to an announcement either arrives or departs, only the senior member need be announced.
- When the visitor reaches a predetermined point, the sideboys are called to attention, and the boatswain’s mate pipes “alongside.”
- When the visitor reaches a designated point on the brow, the sideboys and all others on the quarterdeck salute as the boatswain’s mate pipes “over the side."
- When the visitor departs, the process is repeated in reverse.
- The boatswain's mate is permitted to salute left-handed if he uses his right hand to hold the call pipe.

— Office of the Chief of Naval Operations, OPNAVINST 1710.12

Honors and Ceremonies
| Dignitary | Uniform | Guns | R&F | Guard | Sideboys |
|---|---|---|---|---|---|
| President/Foreign Head of State^{[a]} | Full Dress | 21 | 4 | yes | 8 |
| Secretary of the Navy | Full Dress | 19 | 4 | yes | 8 |
| Joint Chiefs of Staff | Full Dress | 19 | 4 | yes | 8 |
| State Governor (while in state) | Full Dress | 19 | 4 | yes | 8 |
| Ambassador (while in country) | Full Dress | 19 | 4 | yes | 8 |
| O-10 Military Officers | Full Dress | 17 | 4 | yes | 8 |
| O-9 Military Officers | Full Dress | 15 | 3 | yes | 8 |
| O-8 Military Officers | Full Dress | 13 | 2 | yes | 6 |
| Consul General (while in region) | Full Dress | 11 | 1 | yes | 6 |
| O-7 Military Officers | Full Dress | 11 | 1 | yes | 6 |
| Mayor of a City (while in city) | Uniform of the Day | n/a | n/a | n/a | 4 |
| O-5/O-6 Military Officers | Uniform of the Day | n/a | n/a | n/a | 4 |
| Other Commissioned Officers | Uniform of the Day | n/a | n/a | n/a | 2 |

^{[a]} Foreign dignitaries are given honors as equivalent to U.S. roles where applicable.

JMSDF RADM Nakata arrives aboard USS George Washington

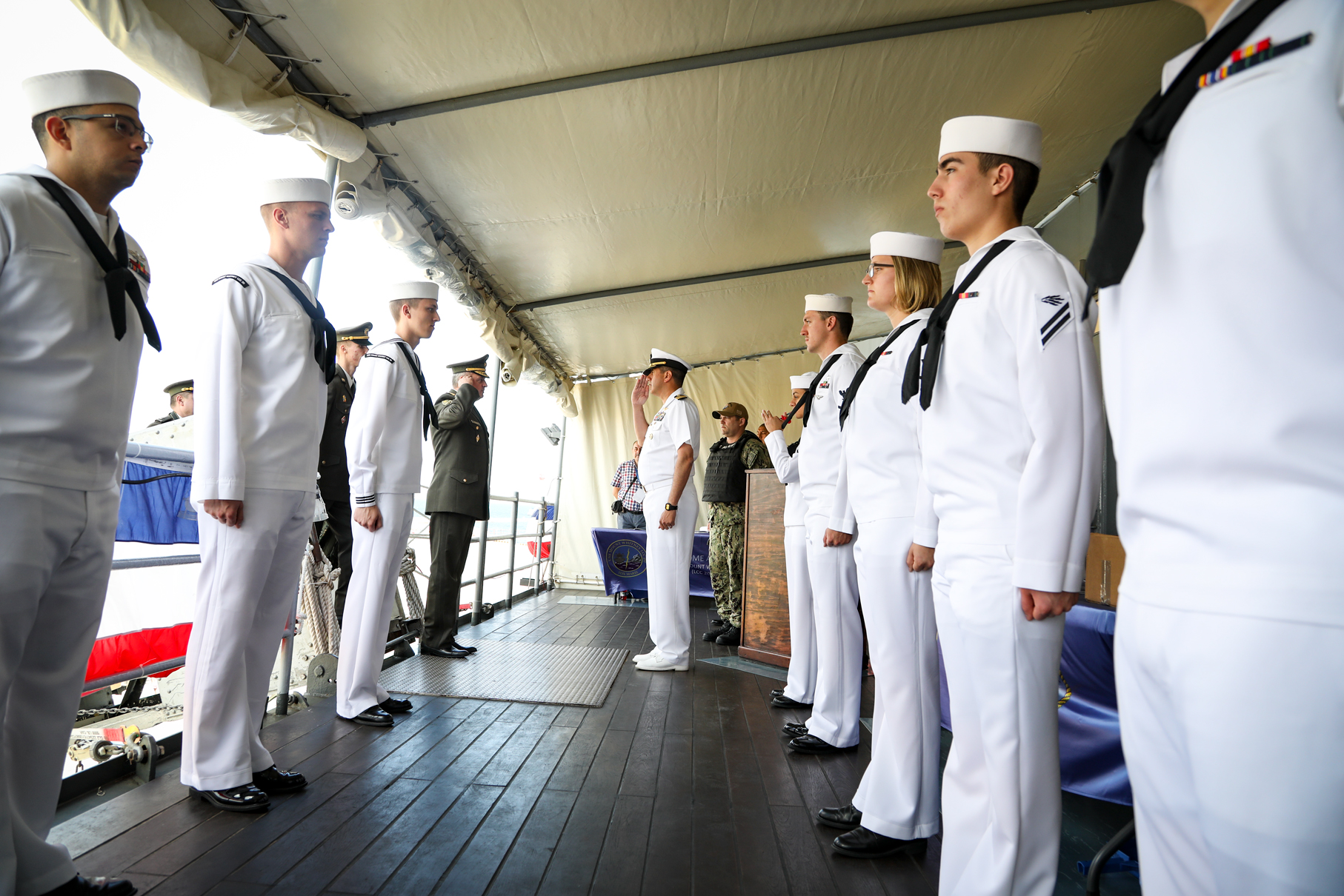
Sideboys await their command to render honors aboard Mount Whitney

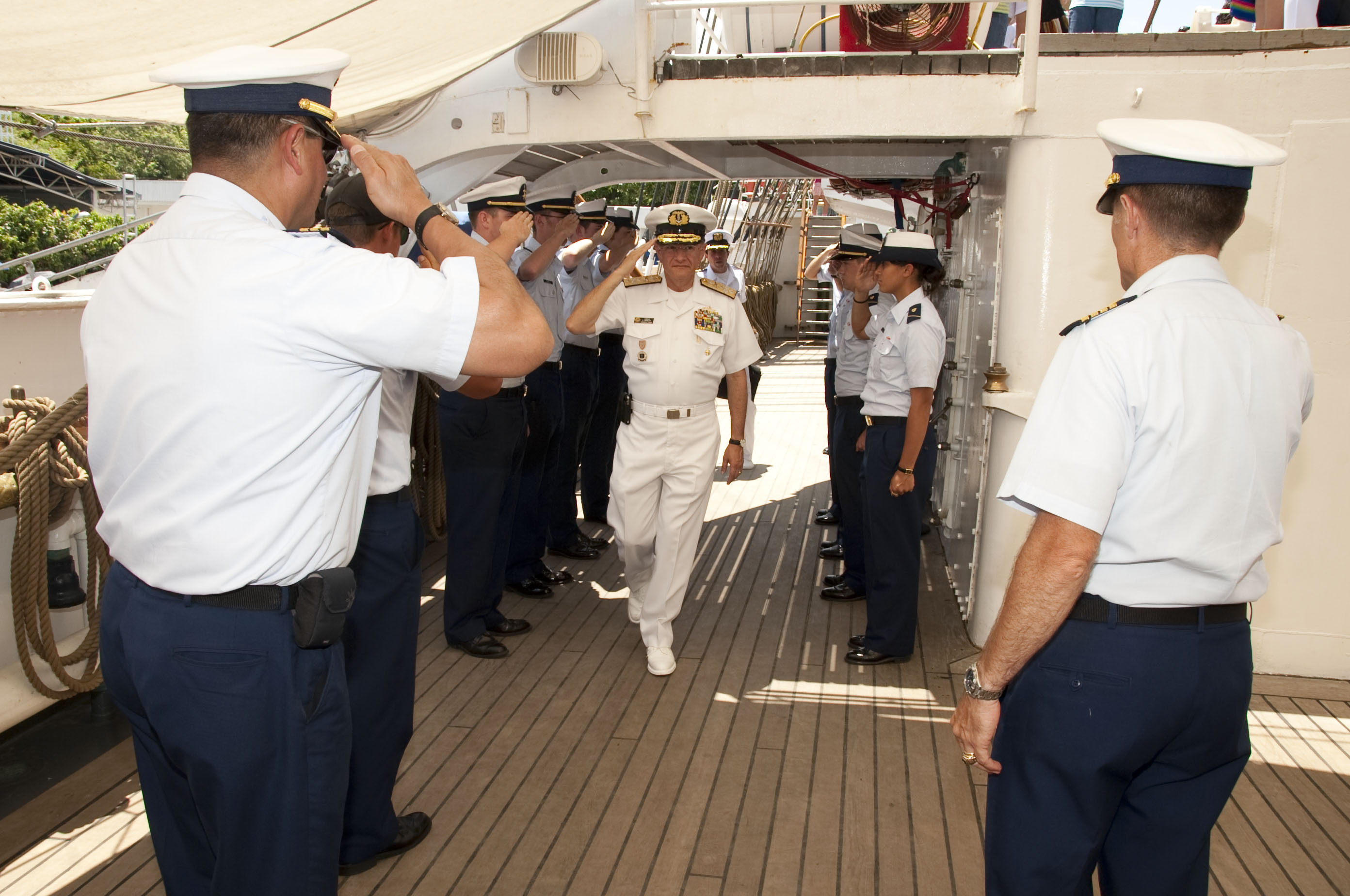
USCG Sideboys greet a dignitary aboard Eagle
