= French bowline =

Type of knot

Some consider that a French bowline is the same as a Portuguese bowline, i.e. a bowline with two loops that can be used as a bosun's chair.

A different knot is however also known as a French bowline.

This form of bowline is similar to a standard bowline but there are several loops so that there is less likelihood of damage to a delicate object secured by the bowline. As with a standard bowline, the knot cannot tighten. Pressure is distributed over a wider area than in the case of a standard bowline. The main advantage of this method is that the knot can be tied with one hand.

A convenient way to tie a French bowline can be:

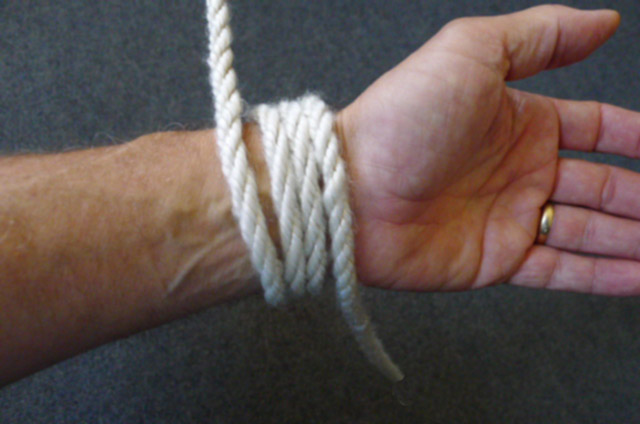
1. Wind the running end several times round the object to be tied, leaving enough running end for one further turn.

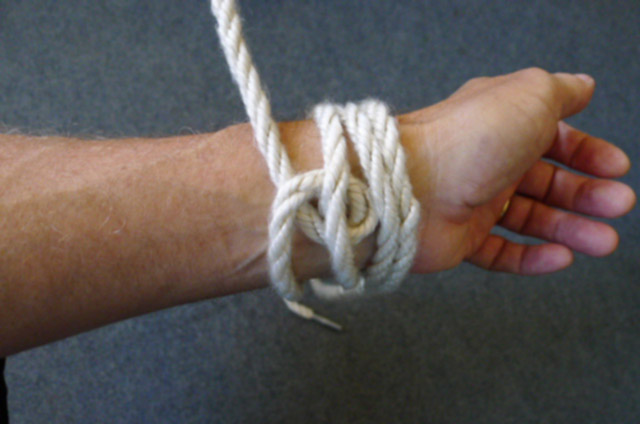
2. Form a loop in the standing end.

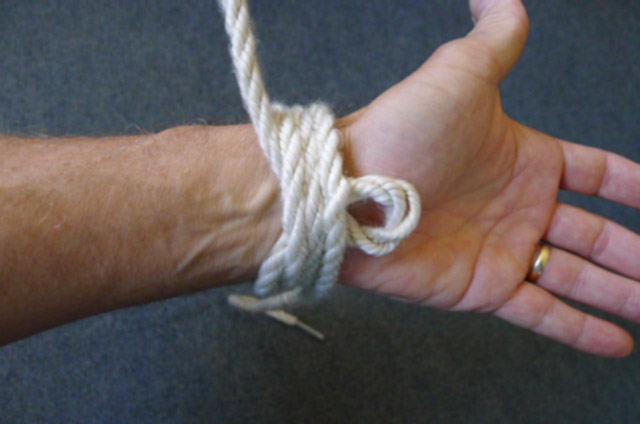
3. Pass this behind the winds in the running end until it projects beyond these.

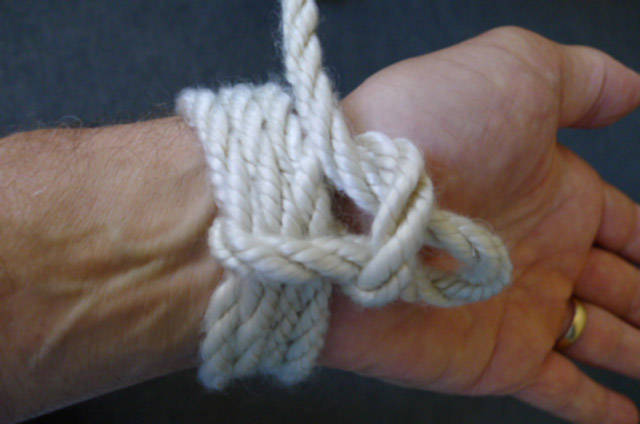
4. Form a bight in the standing end and push this through the loop.

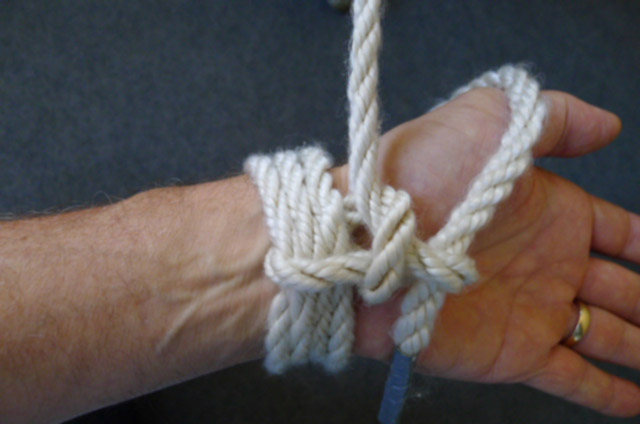
5. Bring the running end behind and through the bight.

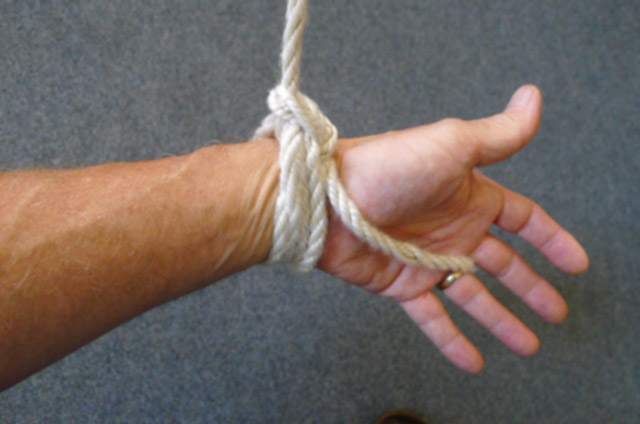
6. Pull on the standing end to pull the bight back through the loop and form the knot.
