= Ship's bell =

Bell made for use on a ship

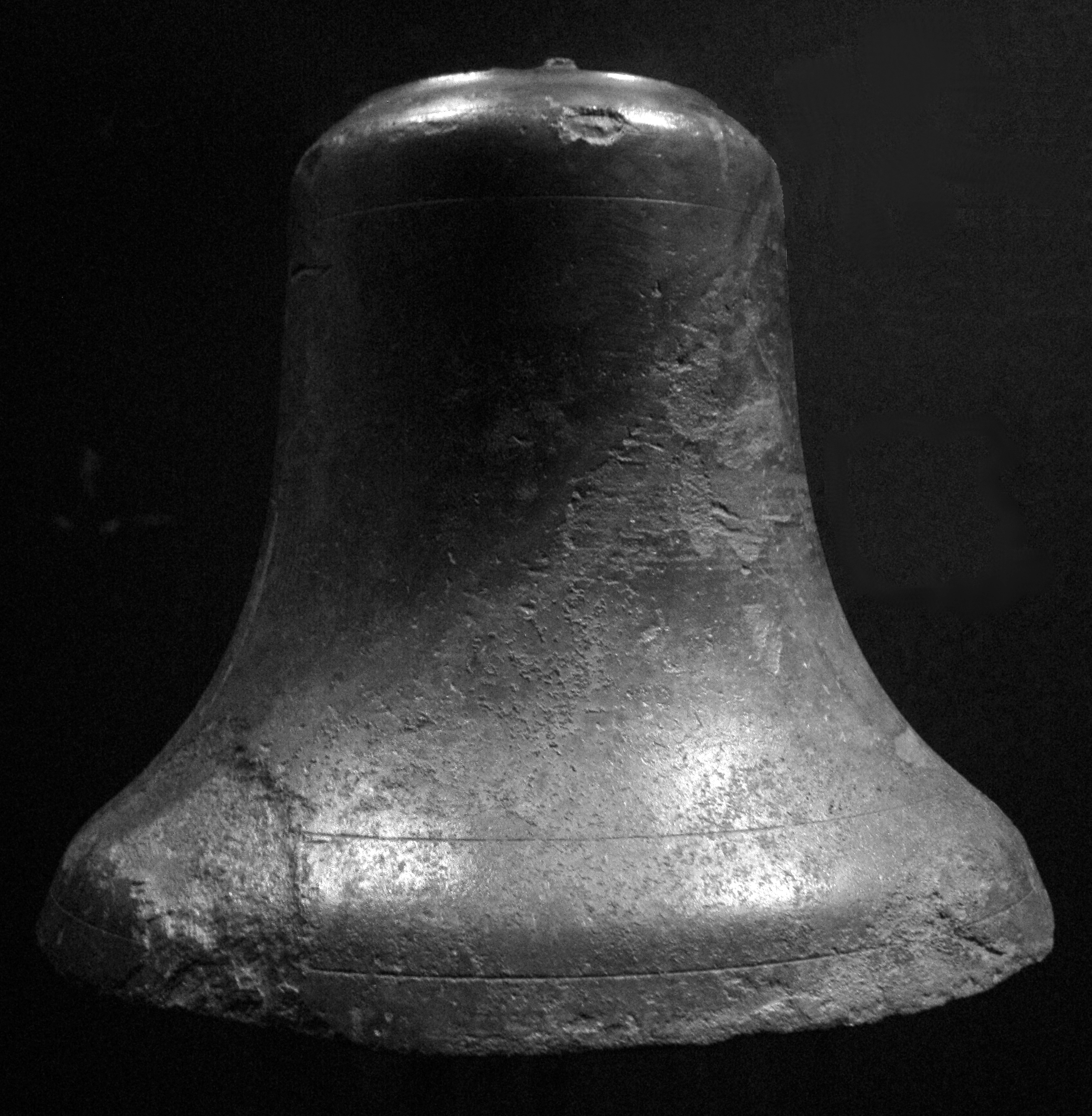
Bell from RMS Titanic

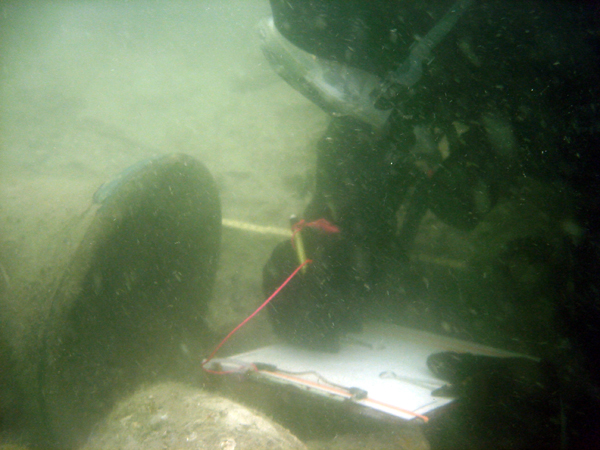
An underwater archaeologist with the Lighthouse Archaeological Maritime Program in St. Augustine, Florida, recording the ship's bell discovered on the 18th-century Storm Wreck

A ship's bell is a bell on a ship that is used for the indication of time as well as other traditional functions. The bell itself is usually made of brass or bronze, and normally has the ship's name engraved or cast on it.

== Strikes ==
=== Timing of ship's watches ===
Unlike civil clock bells, the strikes of a ship's bell do not accord to the number of the hour. Instead, there are eight bells, one for each half-hour of a four-hour watch. In the age of sailing, watches were timed with a 30-minute hourglass. Bells would be struck every time the glass was turned, and in a pattern of pairs for easier counting, with any odd bells at the end of the sequence.

==== Classical system ====
The classical, or traditional, system was:

Number of bells	Bell pattern	Watch						
Number of bells	Bell pattern	Middle	Morning	Fore- noon	After- noon	Dog		First
Number of bells	Bell pattern	Middle	Morning	Fore- noon	After- noon	First	Last	First
One bell	1	00:30	04:30	08:30	12:30	16:30	18:30 (Note: British usage after the Nore mutiny.)	20:30
Two bells	2	01:00	05:00	09:00	13:00	17:00	19:00	21:00
Three bells	2 1	01:30	05:30	09:30	13:30	17:30	19:30	21:30
Four bells	2 2	02:00	06:00	10:00	14:00	18:00		22:00
Five bells	2 2 1	02:30	06:30	10:30	14:30		18:30	22:30
Six bells	2 2 2	03:00	07:00	11:00	15:00		19:00	23:00
Seven bells	2 2 2 1	03:30	07:30	11:30	15:30		19:30	23:30
Eight bells	2 2 2 2	04:00	08:00	12:00 (Note: Before the introduction of time zones, noon was not struck by the hourglass, but when the captain or officer of the deck confirmed local noon by the sun, using a sextant.)	16:00		20:00	24:00

Most of the crew of a ship would be divided into two to four groups, called watches. Each watch would take its turn with the essential activities of manning the helm, navigating, trimming sails, and keeping a lookout.

The hours between 16:00 and 20:00 are so arranged because that watch (the "dog watch") was divided in two. The odd number of watches aimed to give each person a different watch each day; it also allowed the entire crew of a vessel to eat an evening meal, the normal time being at 17:00 with first dog watchmen eating at 18:00.

==== Simpler system ====
Some "ship's bell" clocks use a simpler system:

Number of bells	Bell pattern	Hour (a.m. and p.m.)		
One bell	1	12:30	4:30	8:30
Two bells	2	1:00	5:00	9:00
Three bells	2 1	1:30	5:30	9:30
Four bells	2 2	2:00	6:00	10:00
Five bells	2 2 1	2:30	6:30	10:30
Six bells	2 2 2	3:00	7:00	11:00
Seven bells	2 2 2 1	3:30	7:30	11:30
Eight bells	2 2 2 2	4:00	8:00	12:00

=== Other uses ===
- Ship's bells are also used for safety in foggy conditions, their most important modern use.
- On US naval vessels, bells additionally are rung as "boat gongs" for officers and dignitaries coming aboard or leaving the ship, in a number equivalent to the number of sideboys to which the visitor is entitled.
- At midnight on New Year's Eve, 16 bells would be struck – eight bells for the old year and eight bells for the new.
- When a sailor has died he or she can be honoured with the sounding of eight bells; meaning "end of the watch". The term "eight bells" can also be used in an obituary, as a nautical euphemism for finished.

== Markings on the bell ==
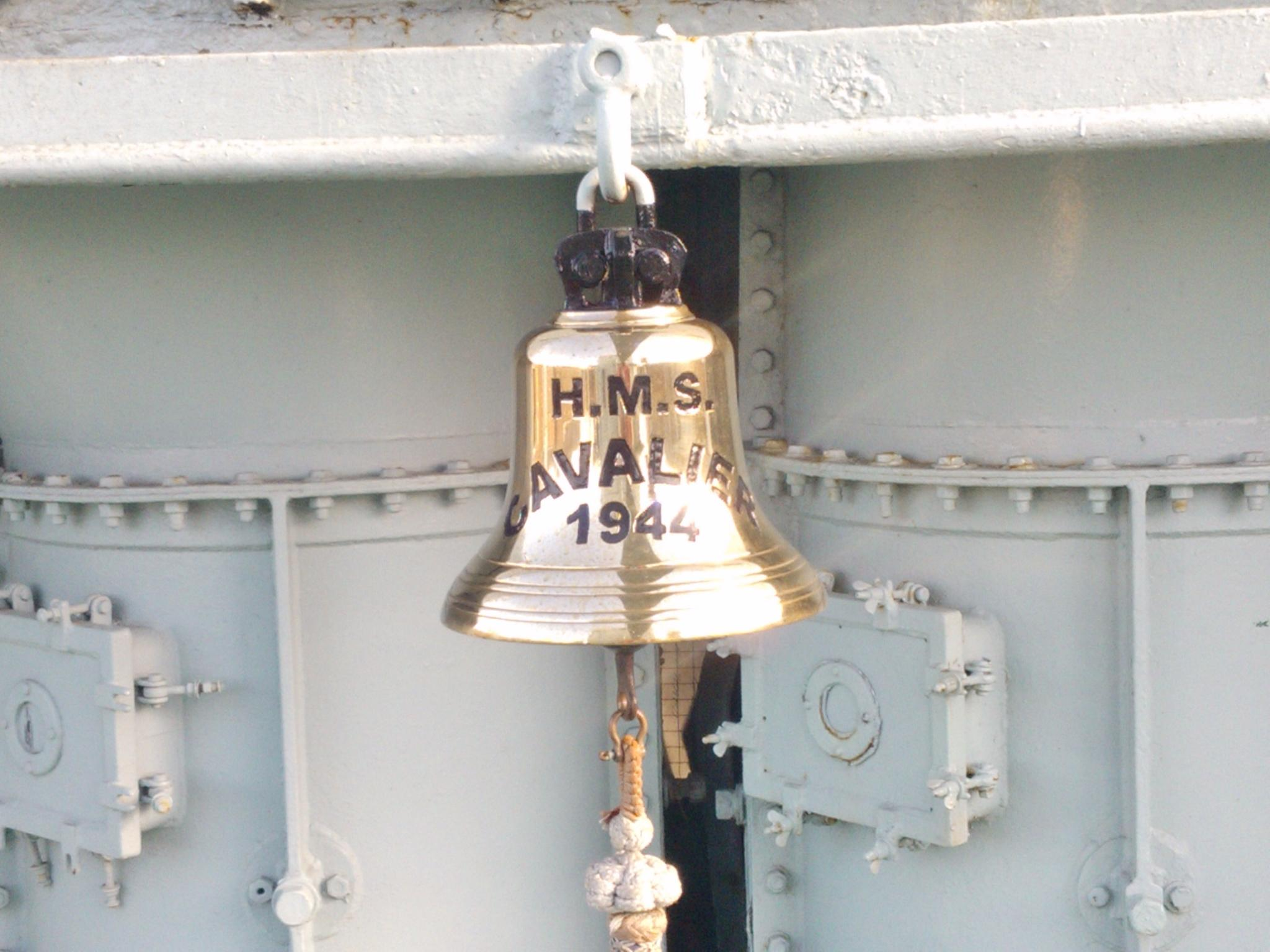
Ship's bell of HMS Cavalier

The ship's name is traditionally engraved or cast onto the surface of the bell, often with the year the ship was launched, as well. The earliest ship's bell was recovered from the wreck-site of a Portuguese armada ship off the coast of Oman. The bell was dated 1498. Occasionally (especially on more modern ships) the bell will also carry the name of the shipyard that built the ship. If a ship's name is changed, maritime tradition is that the original bell carrying the original name will remain with the vessel. A ship's bell is a prized possession when a ship is broken up and often provides the only positive means of identification in the case of a shipwreck.

== Number of bells ==
Most United States Navy ships of the post–World War II era have actually carried 2 or 3 bells: the larger bell engraved with the ship's name, mounted on the forecastle, and smaller bells in the pilot house and at the quarterdeck at the 1MC (public address) station, for use in making shipwide announcements and marking the time. The larger bell on the forecastle is rung periodically as a fog signal when the ship is at anchor in reduced visibility.

== Cook and boatswain ==
According to seafaring legend, the ship's cooks and boatswain's mates had a duty arrangement to give the cooks more sleep. The boatswain's mates, who worked 24 hours a day on watches, would build the fire in the stove, so the cook could get up a little while later and the fire would be already going so he could begin preparing breakfast. In return, between meals, the cooks would shine the bell, which was traditionally the boatswain's mates' responsibility.

== Baptizing children ==
It is a naval tradition to baptize children using the ship's bell as a baptismal font and to engrave the names of the children on the bell afterwards. Christening information from the bells held by the Canadian Forces Base Esquimalt Museum has been entered into a searchable data archive.

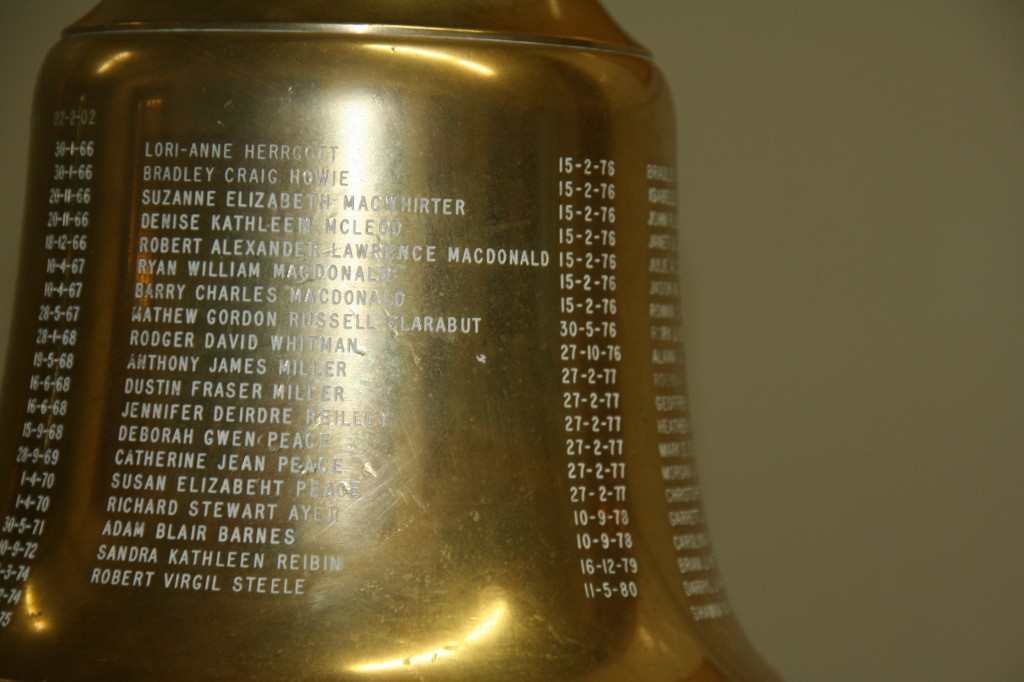
Ship's bell as a baptismal font at chapel, Yeo Hall, Royal Military College of Canada'

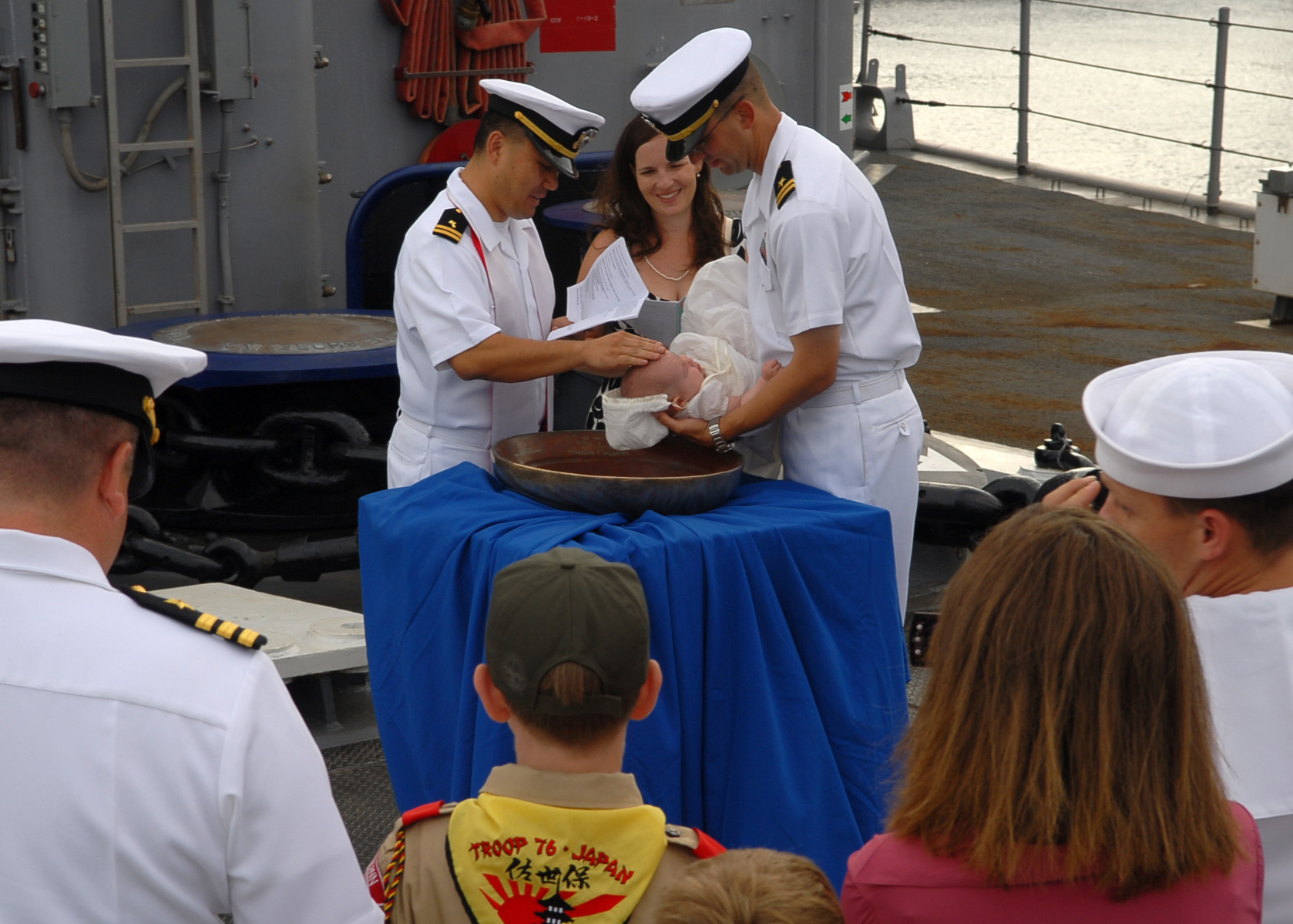
A baby is baptized with holy water from the ship's bell'

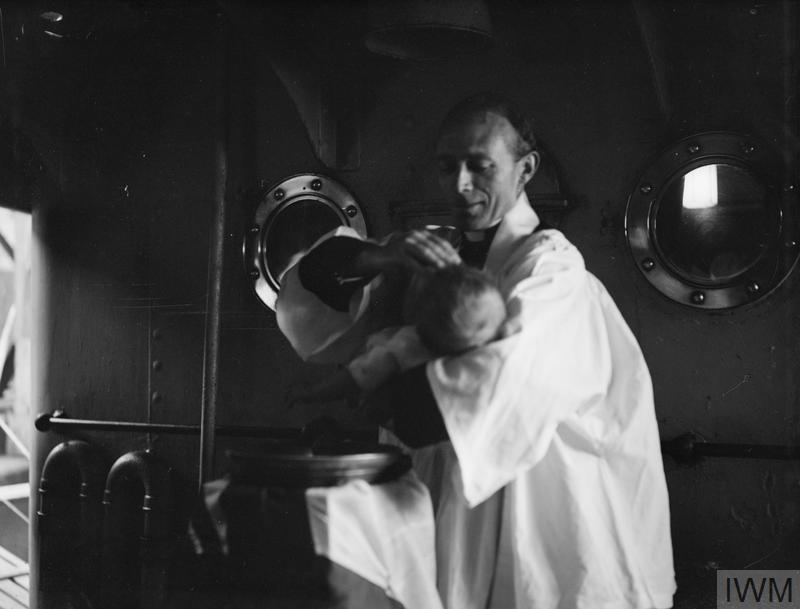
A baby is baptised by a chaplain on a Royal Navy armed trawler in 1943.

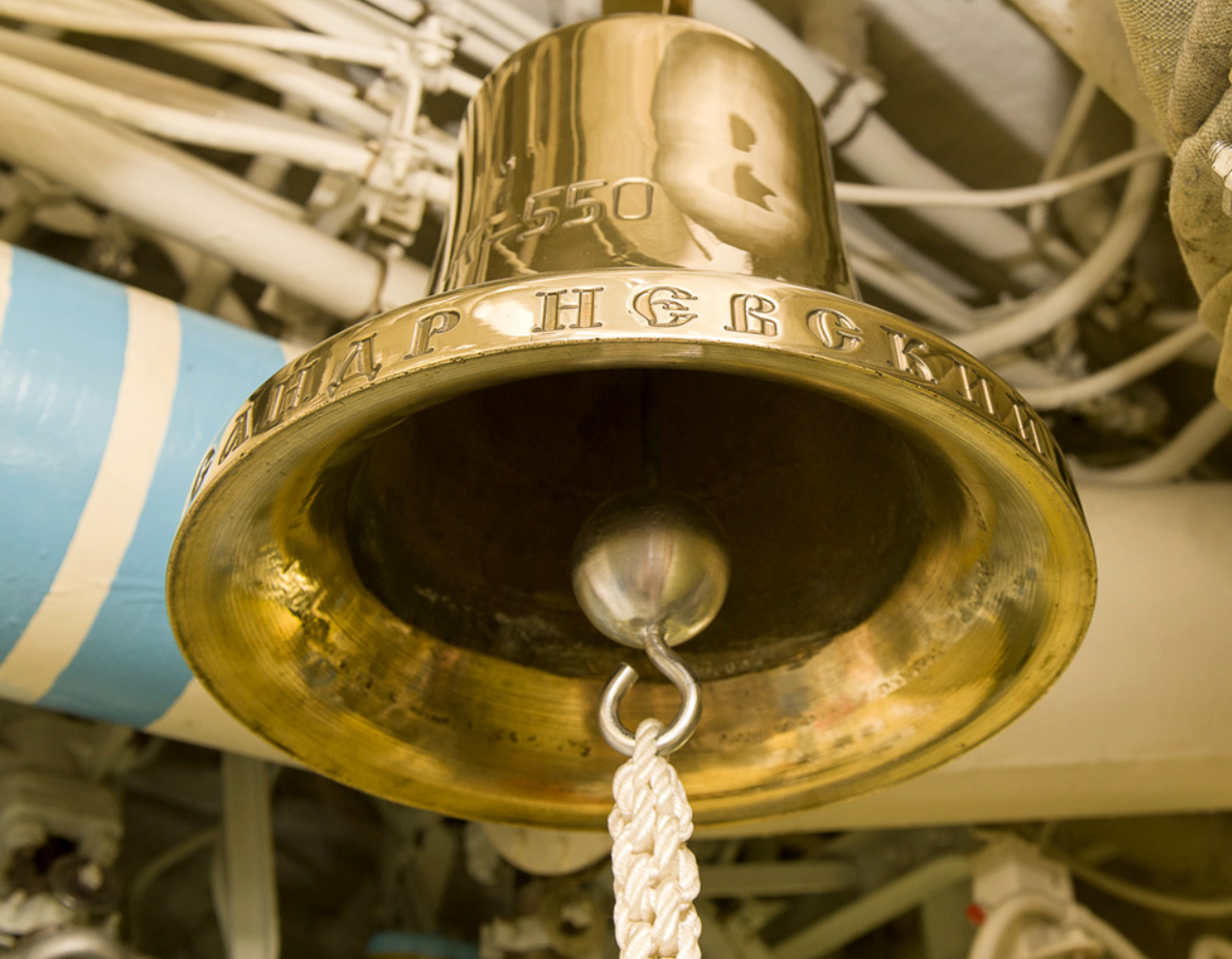
Ship's bell on the nuclear submarine Alexander Nevsky.

== See also ==
- Eight Bells (painting)
- The Lutine Bell
- Watchstanding
- When Eight Bells Toll
