= Bosun's chair =

Seat used to suspend a person working at height

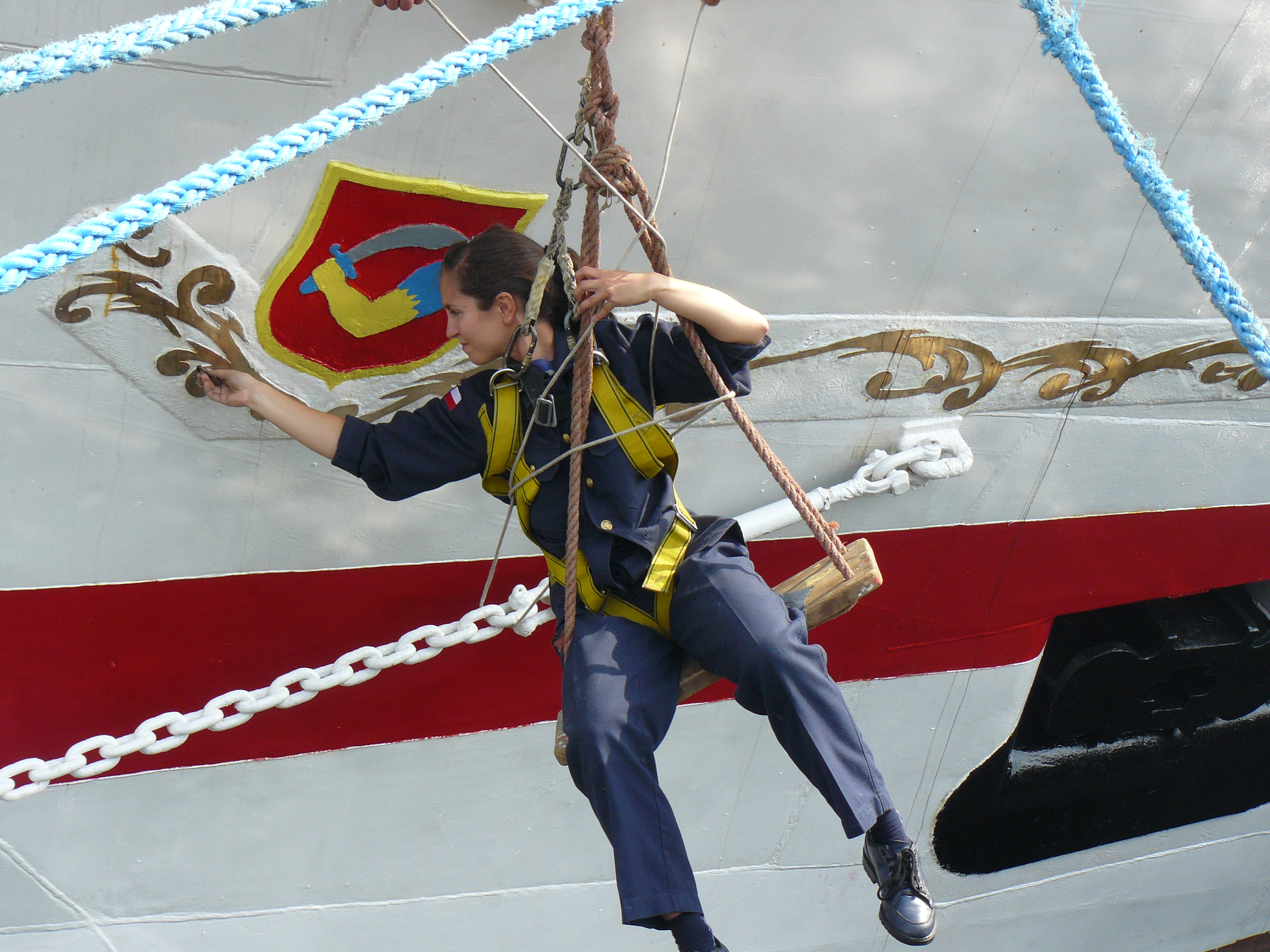
Bosun's chair used by a crew member of the ORP Iskra

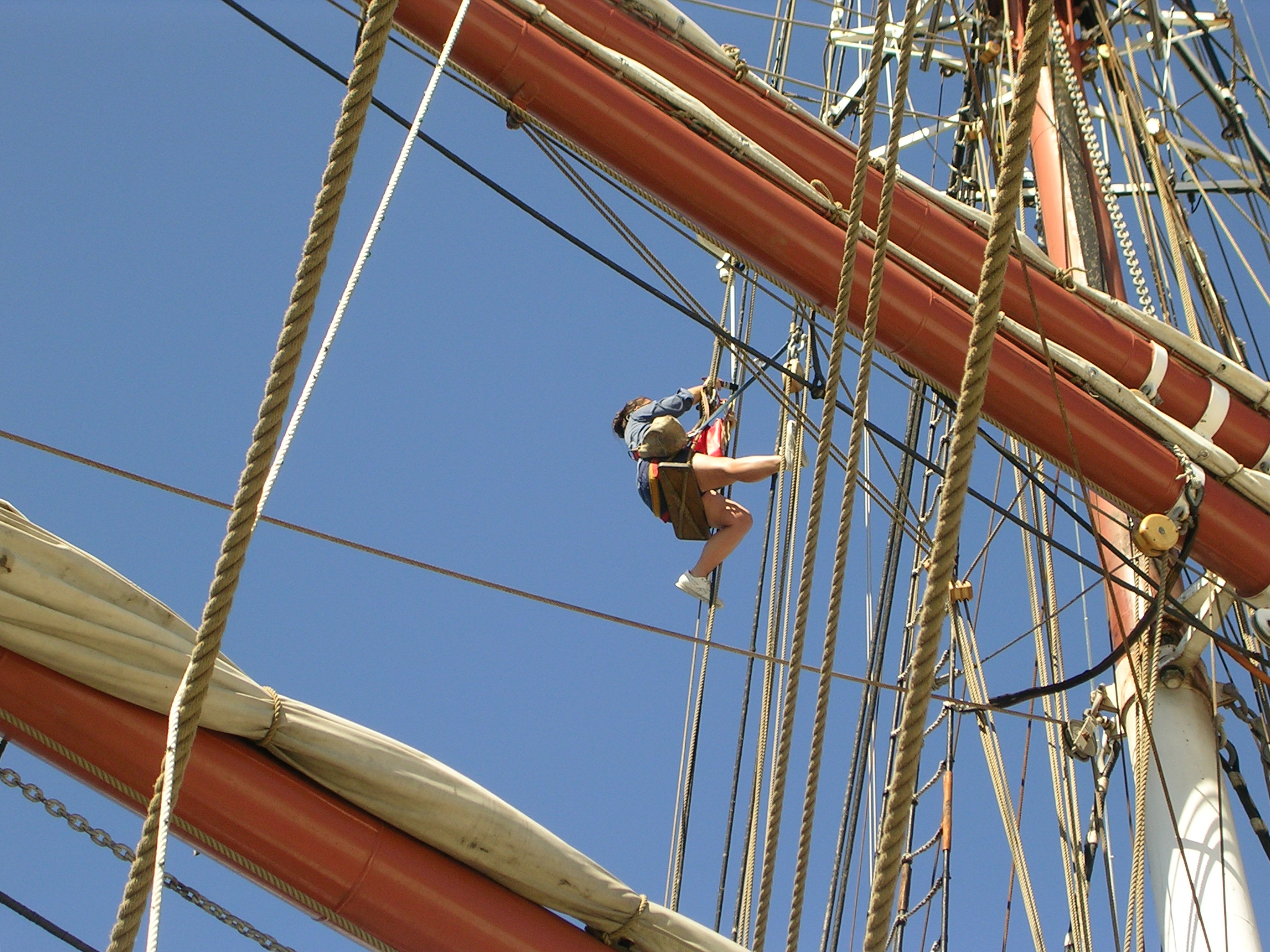
A bosun's chair, in use by a bosun, re-tarring a section of a backstay on the Prince William after making a minor repair.

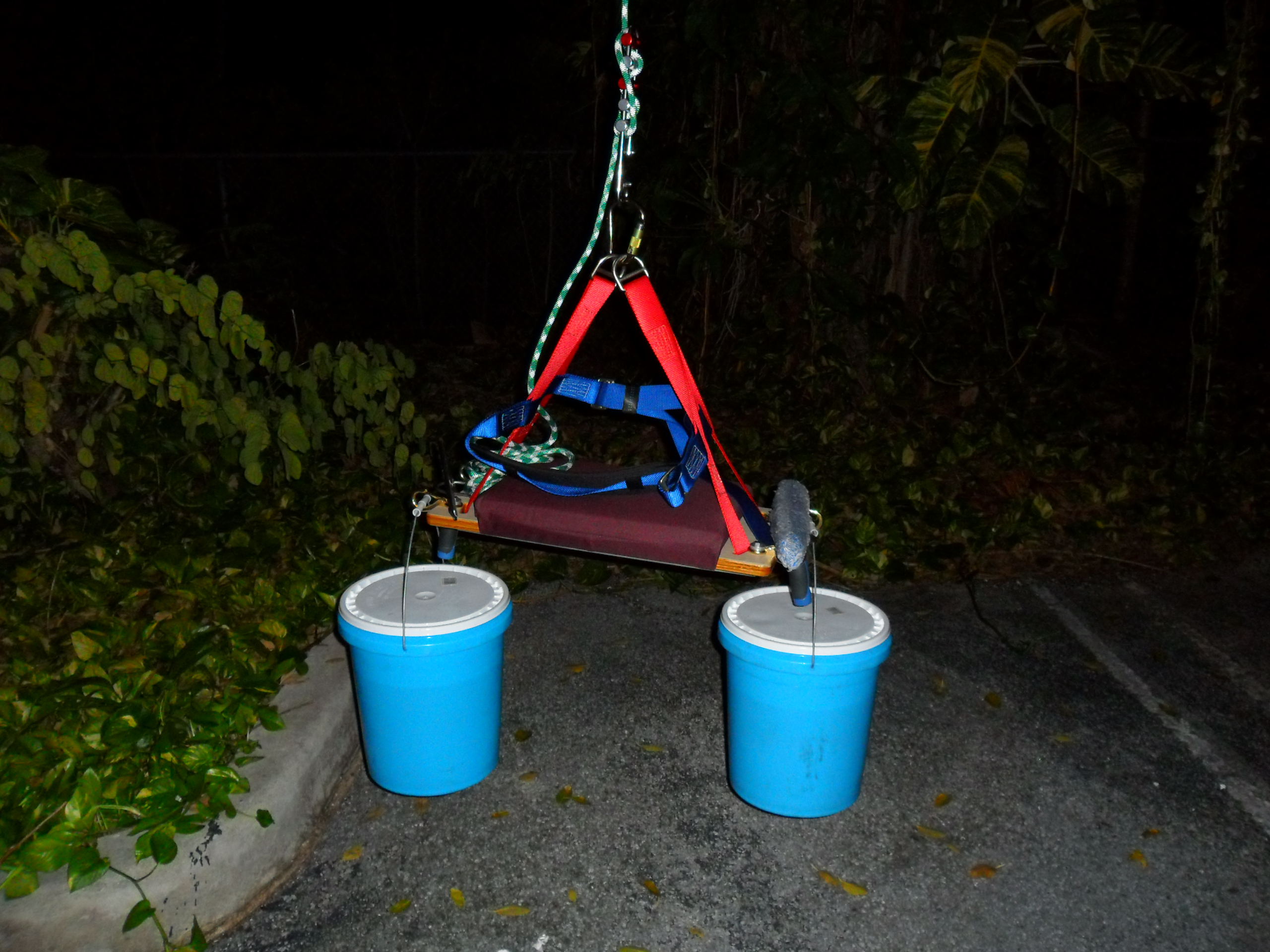
A window cleaner's bosun's chair connected to a descent-only rope system

A bosun's chair (or boatswain's chair) is a device used to suspend a person from a rope to perform work aloft. Originally just a short plank or swath of heavy canvas, many modern bosun's chairs incorporate safety devices similar to those found in rock climbing harnesses such as safety clips and additional lines.

In addition to the maritime applications they were developed for, bosun's chairs are also used for working at height in various maintenance industries. In commercial window cleaning, the term bosun's chair describes devices suspended from rope and equipped with seatboards, such as descent-only controlled descent apparatuses (CDAs).

== Competition ==
Bosun's Chair has become a competition event in Sea Scout Regattas in the United States such as the Old Salt's Regatta and the Ancient Mariner's Regatta. The event is based on a practice from old navy ships where high-ranking officers would be lifted onto the ships instead of climbing aboard. The bosun's chair would be attached to a block on the davit with a line. The officer would have the chair put under him, or the French bowline tied around him, and then sideboys would lift him onto the deck of the ship on the command of the bosun's whistle.

The event requires a line running through a block connected to a tower, simulating a ship's mast. Two participants approach the line and prepare it for the event. When ready, the participants stand at attention. On the signal from the judges time starts. One person ties into one side of the line using a French bowline. The person places one loop around their waist and the other under their legs. The other person gets ready to pull the first person up to the block. When the person who is tied in reaches the top and touches the block they yell touch. Time then stops and they are slowly lowered to the ground. As soon as the person touches the ground or the two participants touch each other time begins. The first person unties and the second person ties in. The second person is raised to the top, time stops, and they are lowered. Time again starts when the person touches the ground or their partner, and is stopped finally when the knot is untied, and the participants stand at attention again. A competitive time is under one minute for the entire operation.

=== Safety ===
The competition judges are in charge of safety. If the French bowline is tied wrong or does not have the six inches of tail required, safety will be called and with time running, the competitors will have to fix this. Another reason to call safety is if the loops of the French bowline are not in the right places or are too loose. If the descent is not done in a controlled hand-over-hand method, the team will be disqualified.

=== Variations ===
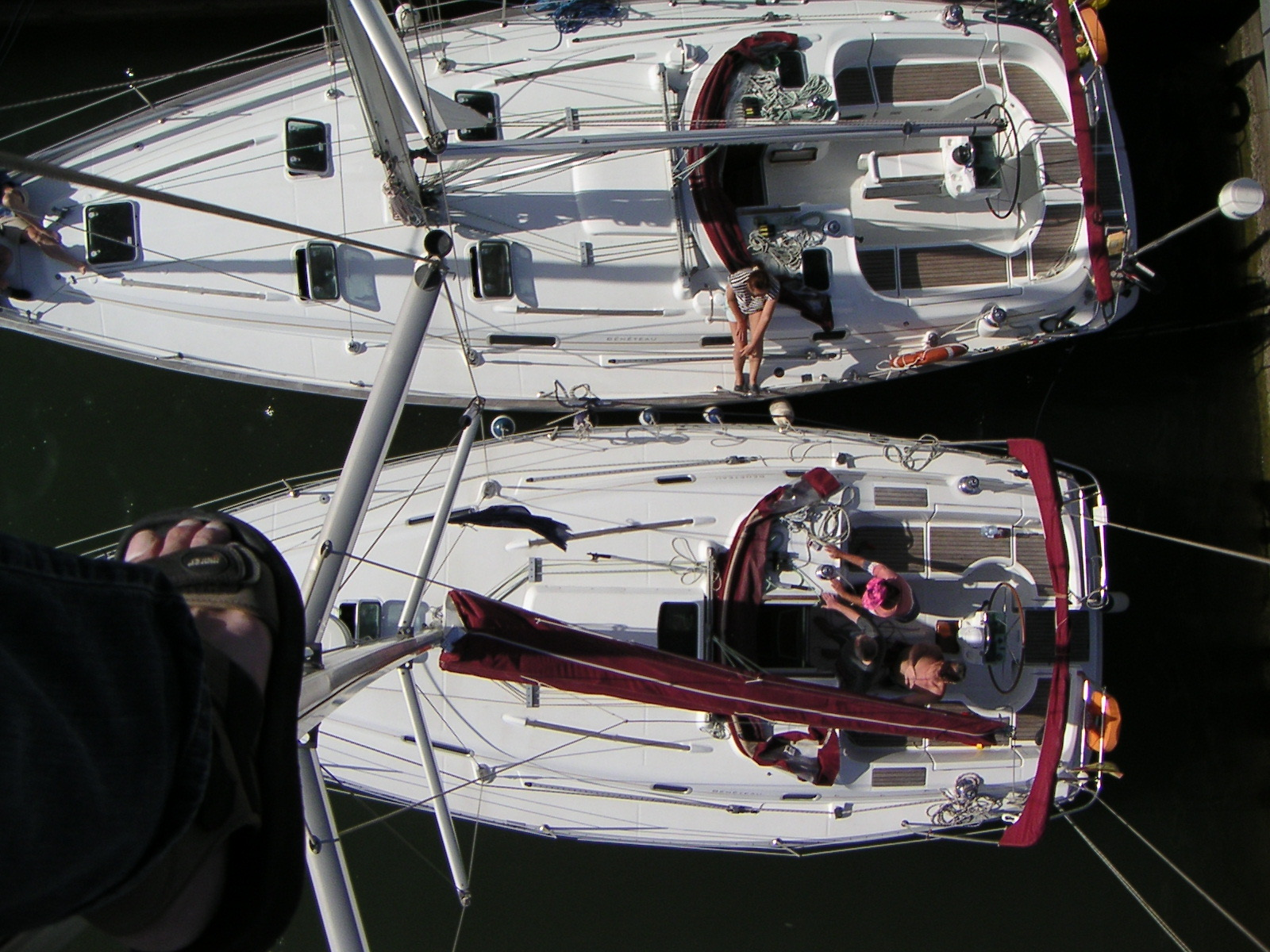
View from the bosun's chair towards the ship deck from a height of around 15 m, the full mast height of the c. 12 m long sailing yacht. The photo was taken while a broken line running over the top of the mast was being replaced.

At the Old Salt's regatta, the bosun's chair is a six-person competition. Instead of multiple teams of two competing, the entire team lines up for the event. The first person ties in while the second person raises them. Once they touch the ground, the first person unties and is done. The second person then ties in and is lifted by the third person. This continues until the final person lifts someone and the second to last person is lifted, unties and the crew returns to attention.

== See also ==
- Breeches buoy
- Boatswain
- Deck department
