= Pusser's =

Brand of rum

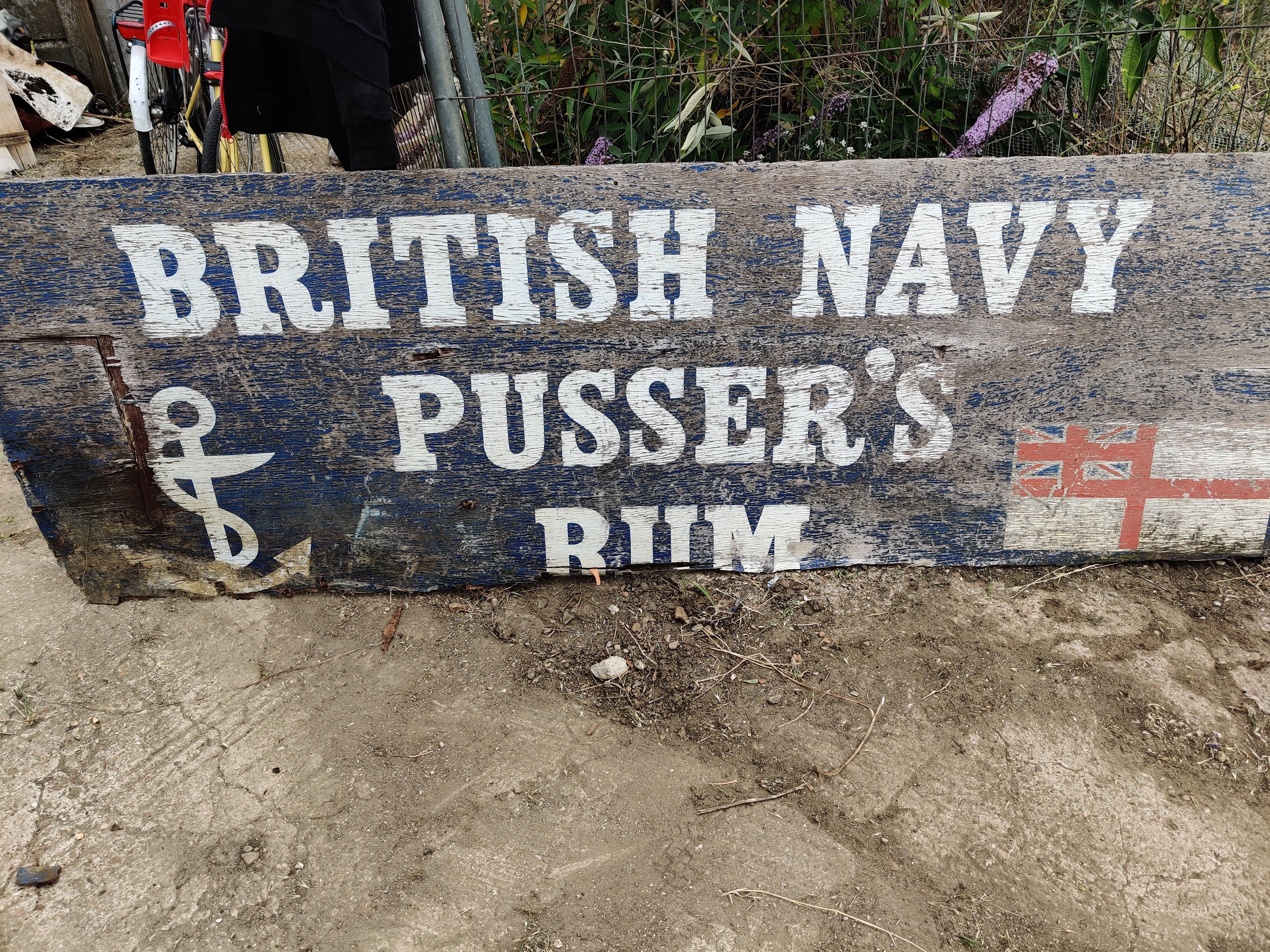
A derelict sign promoting Pusser's Rum

Pusser's Rum is a brand name of rum produced by Pusser's Rum Ltd., which was founded in British Virgin Islands, and has been headquartered in Charleston, South Carolina, since 2013. Nine years after the Royal Navy discontinued the daily rum ration in 1970, the company was founded to produce the rum from the original Royal Navy recipe, using a blend of five West Indian rums.

== History ==
"Pusser" is Royal Navy slang for a purser, a ship's supply officer, now called a Logistics Officer. Thus the word came to connote "one hundred per cent Service," as in "pusser's issue." "Pusser's issue" applies to anything supplied by the Royal Navy, such as a "pusser's grip", a canvas bag that sailors may use instead of a suitcase (it folds flat and is thus easy to stow on board ship).

The Royal Navy issued the last tot (ration) to "the fleet" on 31 July 1970. The decision to end the daily rum ration had been announced by the Admiralty in December 1969, which concluded that the practice was no longer compatible with the demands of increasingly sophisticated naval equipment. Since then, this has been known in Royal Naval slang as "Black Tot Day." The remaining rum stocks were put up for auction. They were bought by Brian Cornford, shipped to Gibraltar and held in a secure bonded warehouse. As each visiting Royal Navy ship visited Gibraltar, it was the task of Cornford and his general manager, John Kania, to supply individual, wax-dated, corked, wicker-covered demijohns containing full strength (approx 110 proof) to the ships. When the individual gallon jars were finally sold, the large wooden barrels were tapped. It was found that over the years some of the contents in each wood barrel had evaporated, lowering the alcohol concentration somewhat. The barrelled rum was decanted into litre bottles and sold primarily to RN, RAF and Army messes and selected local pubs.

Some of this rum still pops up in premium auction houses. Because of the wax seal the alcohol concentration is similar to when it was bottled. It attracts high prices both because it is aged spirits, and because of its historical significance.

In 1979, nearly a decade after the Royal Navy abandoned the custom of the daily tot of rum, company founder Charles Tobias obtained the rights to blending information associated with the naval rum ration and formed the company to produce the spirit according to the original Admiralty recipe, a blend of five West Indian rums without colouring agents. He established a blending and bottling operation on Tortola in the British Virgin Islands, where the first bottles of Pusser’s Rum were produced. In 1990, Tobias sold the brand to Jim Beam. He repurchased it in, returning the company to independent ownership.

In 1989, Pusser's Rum Ltd. filed a US trademark for the name and recipe for the Painkiller, a cocktail from the Virgin Islands made with rum, cream of coconut, pineapple juice, and orange juice. When a Tiki bar named Painkiller opened on the Lower East Side of Manhattan in May 2011, Pusser's sent a cease and desist order to owners Giuseppe Gonzalez and Richard Boccato, both for the bar's name and for selling Painkiller cocktails made with rums other than Pusser's. Gonzalez and Boccato reached an out-of-court settlement with Pusser's, which included them renaming the bar to PKNY. In response to the news, numerous bartenders organized a boycott against Pusser's.

== Production ==
During the period of the naval rum issue, the Admiralty stated that the blend comprised rums purchased on the London market from several parts of the British Empire, principally British Guiana and Trinidad, with Jamaica included when price permitted. The blending was carried out at the Royal Navy Victualing Yard at Deptford. By 1956, the Admiralty stated that the blend contained rum from British Guiana, Trinidad, Barbados, South Africa, and Australia, with approximately 60 per cent originating from British Guiana.

== Philanthropy ==
As part of the agreement with the Admiralty granting Tobias the right to produce Pusser's Rum to the original specification, the Royal Navy Sailors’ Fund, a naval charity more commonly called the Royal Naval Sailors Fund (‘Tot’ Fund), which was established following the abolition of the daily rum ration to support welfare and amenities for Royal Navy personnel, receives a substantial donation from the worldwide sales of the rum on an ongoing basis. Under the original arrangement, the company contributed US$2 for each case of rum sold, and in 1980 Tobias presented the fund with an initial cheque for £10,000.

== See also ==
- Grog
- Painkiller (cocktail)
- Splice the mainbrace
