= Grog =

Variety of alcoholic beverages

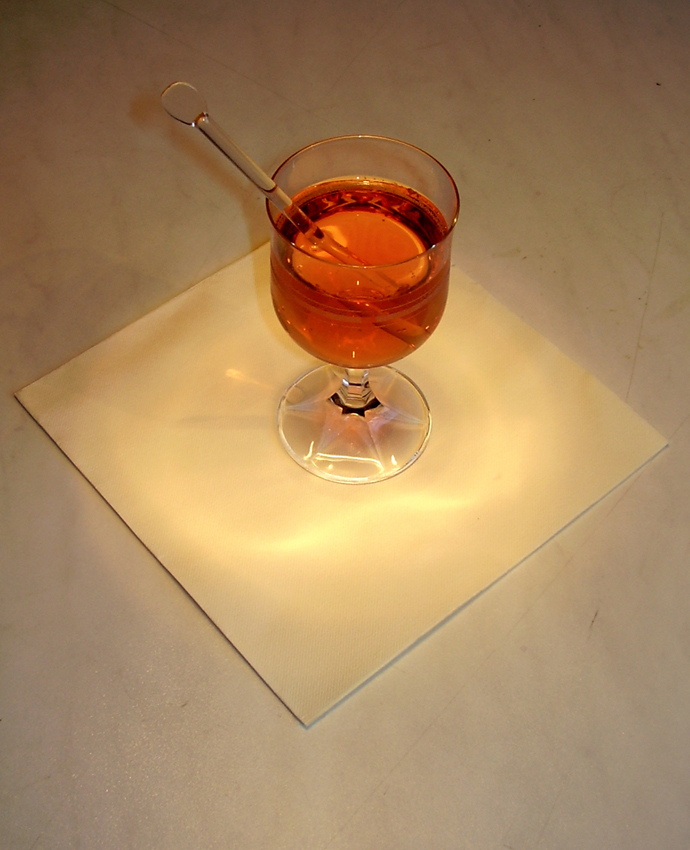
Nondistinct grog

Grog is a term used for a variety of alcoholic beverages.

== Origin and history ==
=== Popularization of rum and invention of grog ===
Following England's conquest of Jamaica in 1655, rum gradually replaced beer and brandy as the drink of choice for the Royal Navy. The prior ration of eight pints of beer was replaced with a ration of one half-pint of spirits. In 1740, to minimise the subsequent illness, drunkenness, and disciplinary problems, British Vice-Admiral Edward Vernon ordered that the daily issue of rum be diluted with water, a water-to-rum ratio of 4:1, with half issued before noon and the remainder after the end of the working day. This both diluted its effects and accelerated its spoilage, preventing hoarding of the allowance. The mixture of rum and water became known as a "grog". This procedure became part of the official regulations of the Royal Navy in 1756 until the reduction of the ration to the "tot" in 1850. Sailors were given one-quarter of an imperial pint (1 gill; 142 millilitres) of rum daily, or 35 imperial oz a week. The issued ration of rum was called a "tot," and typically had a high alcohol content (54.6% ABV). This practice continued until the final ration was issued on 31 July 1970.

Some writers have said that Vernon also added citrus juice to prevent spoilage and that it was found to prevent scurvy. This is not the case, and is based on a misreading of Vernon's order. Having instructed his captains to dilute the sailors' daily allowance of rum with water, he says that those members of the crew "which ... are good husbandmen may from the saving of their salt provisions and bread, purchase sugar and limes to make it more palatable to them." Lime juice was not then known to combat scurvy; scurvy symptoms at the time were largely treated with a diet of "fresh food", sauerkraut, meat broth, malt, and citrus oil.

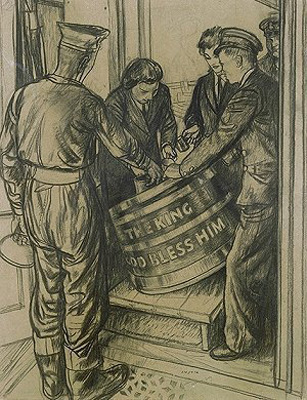
Royal Navy grog ration

=== Etymology ===
The word originally referred to rum diluted with water, which Edward Vernon introduced into the British naval squadron he commanded in the West Indies on 21 August 1740. Vernon wore a coat of grogram cloth and was nicknamed Old Grogram or Old Grog. The Merriam–Webster Collegiate Dictionary, which agrees with this story of the word's origin, states that the word grog was first used in this sense in 1770, though other sources cite 1749.

In the 19th century, coopers who crafted barrels on ships were often called groggers (or jolly jack tars), since when a barrel of rum had been emptied they would fill it up with boiling water and roll it around, creating a drink, which was called grog.

=== Serving practices ===
==== British ships ====
Until the daily tot was discontinued in 1970, Royal Navy rum was 95.5 proof (54.6% ABV); the usual ration was one-eighth of an imperial pint (71 ml), diluted 4:1 with water. Extra rum rations were provided for special celebrations, such as Trafalgar Day, and sailors might share their ration with the cook or with a messmate celebrating a birthday. Until the early 20th century, weaker "six water grog" (rum diluted with water at a 6:1 ratio) was sometimes issued as a punishment to sailors found guilty of drunkenness or neglect.

Over time the distribution of the rum ration acquired a fixed form. At 11:00 am, the boatswain's mate piped "Up spirits", the signal for the petty officer of the day to climb to the quarterdeck and collect the keys to the spirit room from an officer, the ship's cooper, and a detachment of Royal Marines. In procession, they unlocked the door of the spirit room, and witnessed the pumping into a keg of one-eighth pint of rum for every rating and petty officer on the ship aged 20 or more and not under punishment. Two marines lifted the keg to the deck, standing guard while a file of cooks from the petty officers' messes held out their jugs. The sergeant of marines poured the ration under direction of the chief steward, who announced the number of drinking men present in each petty officer's mess. The rest of the rum was mixed in a tub with two parts water, becoming the grog provided to the ratings.

At noon, the boatswain's mate piped "Muster for Rum", and the cooks from each mess presented with tin buckets. The sergeant of marines ladled out the authorised number of tots (eighth-pints) supervised by the petty officer of the day. The few tots of grog remaining in the tub ("plushers"), if any, were poured into the drains (scuppers), visibly running into the sea.

The petty officers were served first, and entitled to take their rum undiluted. The ratings often drank their grog in one long gulp when they finished their watch.

==== American ships ====
The practice of serving grog twice a day carried over into the Continental Navy and the U.S. Navy. Robert Smith, then Secretary of the Navy, experimented with substituting native rye whiskey for the rum. Finding the American sailors preferred it, he made the change permanent. It is said his sailors followed the practice of their British antecedents and took to calling it "Bob Smith" instead of grog.

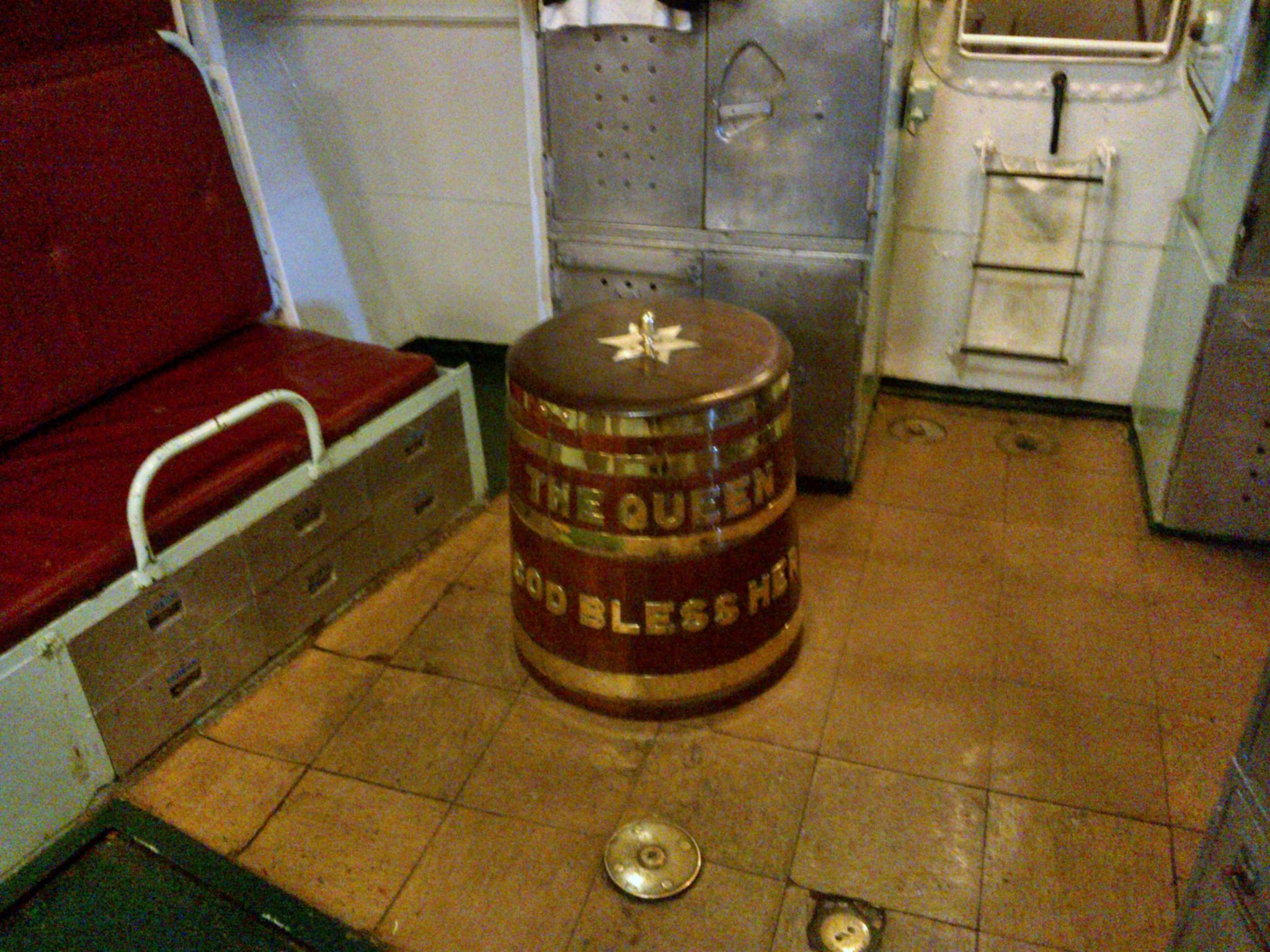
Royal Navy grog tub, found on HMS Cavalier

Unlike their Navy counterparts, American merchant seamen were not encouraged to partake of grog. In his 1848 testimony before a parliamentary committee, Robert Minturn of Grinnell, Minturn & Co "stated that teetotalism not only was encouraged by American ship-owners, but actually earned a bonus from underwriters, who offered a return of ten percent of the insurance premium upon voyages performed without the consumption of spirits. ... The sailors were allowed plenty of hot coffee, night or day, in heavy weather, but grog was unknown on board American merchant ships."

=== End of naval rum rationing ===
The American Navy ended the daily spirit ration on 1 September 1862. The temperance movements of the late 19th century began to change the attitude toward drink in Britain, and the days of grog slowly came to an end. In 1850, the size of the tot was halved to one-eighth of an imperial pint (71 ml) per day. The issue of grog to officers ended in 1881, and to warrant officers in 1918. On 28 January 1970, the "Great Rum Debate" took place in the House of Commons, and on 31 July 1970, later called "Black Tot Day", the practice finally ended, although all ratings received an allowance of an extra can of beer each day as compensation.

In the early stages of British settlement in Australia, the word grog entered common usage, to describe diluted, adulterated, and sub-standard rum, obtainable from sly-grog shops. In the early decades of the Australian colonies such beverages were often the only alcohol available to the working class. Eventually in Australia and New Zealand the word grog came to be used as a slang collective term for alcohol, such as going to the sly-grog shop to buy grog.

Honoring the 18th century British Army regimental mess and grog's historical significance in the military, the United States Navy, U.S. Marine Corps, U.S. Air Force, and U.S. Army carry on a tradition at their formal dining in ceremonies whereby those in attendance who are observed to violate formal etiquette are "punished" by being sent to "the grog" and publicly drink from it in front of the attendees. The grog usually consists of various alcoholic beverages mixed together, unappealing to the taste, and contained in a toilet bowl. A non-alcoholic variety of the grog is also typically available for those in attendance who do not consume alcohol, and can contain anything from hot sauce to mayonnaise intended to make it unappealing as well.

Similar practice continued in the Royal Navy until "Black Tot Day", on 31 July 1970, when concerns over crew members operating machinery under the influence led to the rum ration being abolished.

=== Various recipes ===
While many claim to make a traditional navy grog recipe, there are several accepted forms. The Royal Navy's grog recipe includes water, dark rum, lemon juice, and cinnamon. A commonly found recipe in the Caribbean includes water, light rum, grapefruit juice, orange juice, pineapple juice, cinnamon, and honey.

There is a rhyme with a traditional Royal Navy recipe,

- One of sour (lime or lemon juice),
- Two of sweet (sugar, simple syrup, or molasses),
- Three of strong (The Rum),
- Four of weak (Water).

== Modern usage ==
Modern versions of the drink are often made with hot or boiling water, and sometimes include lemon juice, lime juice, cinnamon, or sugar to add flavor. Additionally in the United States, apple cider is sometimes substituted for water. Rum with water, sugar, and nutmeg was known as bumbo and was more popular with pirates and merchantmen. In Cape Verde, grogue is a distilled spirit made of sugarcane, similar to rum. In Australia and New Zealand, the word has come to mean any alcoholic drink; in Australian Aboriginal English in particular, the term "grog" is extremely commonly used, to the point of appearing outside of casual use, such as in surveys and official documents.

In Northern Germany, grog is a "classic winter drink from East Frisia" made of rum, sugar and water and heated to boiling point. In Sweden and some subcultures within the English-speaking world, grogg is a common description of drinks not made to a recipe, but by mixing various kinds of alcoholic and soft drinks, fruit juice or similar ingredients. In Sweden, the mixture is usually between 5:1 and 1:1 of soft drink/cordial and spirit. The difference between Swedish grog and long drinks, mixed drinks, or punches is the number of ingredients. The number of ingredients in drinks may vary, but grog typically has just one kind of liquor (most commonly vodka or brännvin, but others like rum, whisky, cognac, or eau de vie are also used), and one kind of a non-alcoholic beverage. While there are no standard recipes, some varieties are commonly known:

- Grosshandlargrogg ("wholesaler grog") refers to a mix of eau de vie and Sockerdricka.
- Musöppnare is mixed by adding orange juice to brännvin until the taste of alcohol disappears.
- Vargtass ("Wolf's paw") is a mix of brännvin and lingon cordial.

In other parts of Europe, notably the Netherlands, Belgium, and France, grog is used for a hot drink, usually made of black tea, lemon juice, honey and a splash of rum. It is a popular winter drink, said to be a remedy for the common cold in Belgium and France or for flu in the Netherlands.

In Canada, W. T. Lynch Foods Ltd sells a powdered hot beverage mix marketed in English as "Hot Apple Olde Style Cider Mix" and in Canadian French as "Grog aux pommes mélange à l'ancienne". It is non-alcoholic and marketed as an alternative to other non-alcoholic hot drinks.

Grog has also been used as a metaphoric term for a person's vices, as in the old Irish song "All For Me Grog". The beverage has also lent its name to the word groggy.

== Other uses ==
- Grog, a 2023 album by the American indie rock band Frog

== See also ==
- Glögg
- List of hot beverages
- List of rum producers
- Pusser's
- Splice the mainbrace
