= Pusser =

Pusser may refer to:

- Buford Pusser (1937–1974), American sheriff
- Ship's pusser, the person on a ship responsible for the handling of money on board

== See also ==
- Pusser's rum
