= Rum ration =

Daily amount of rum given to Royal Navy sailors; abolished in 1970

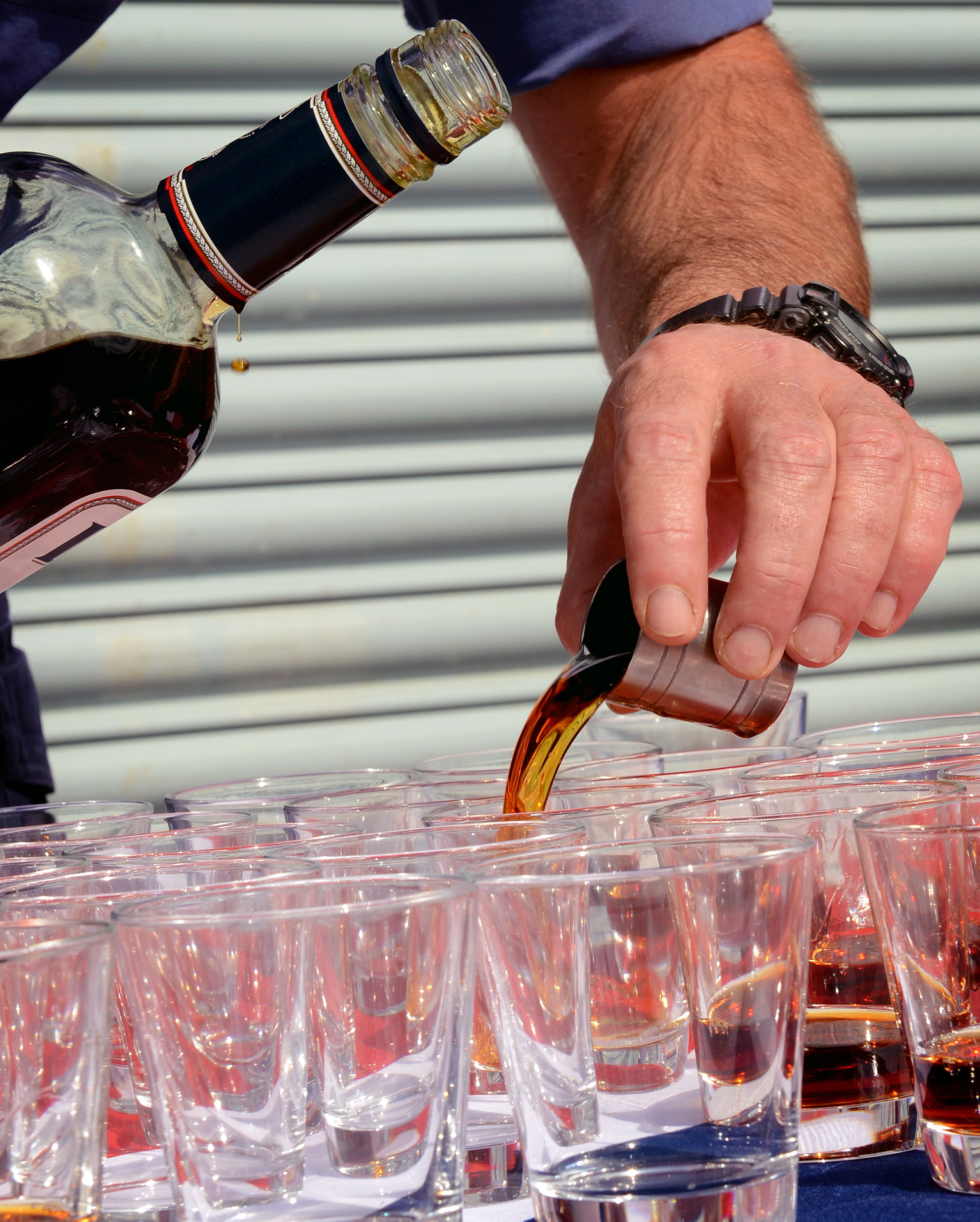
A sailor on board HMS York measures out tots of rum for the ship's company, in preparation for the Royal Navy tradition "Splice the Mainbrace"

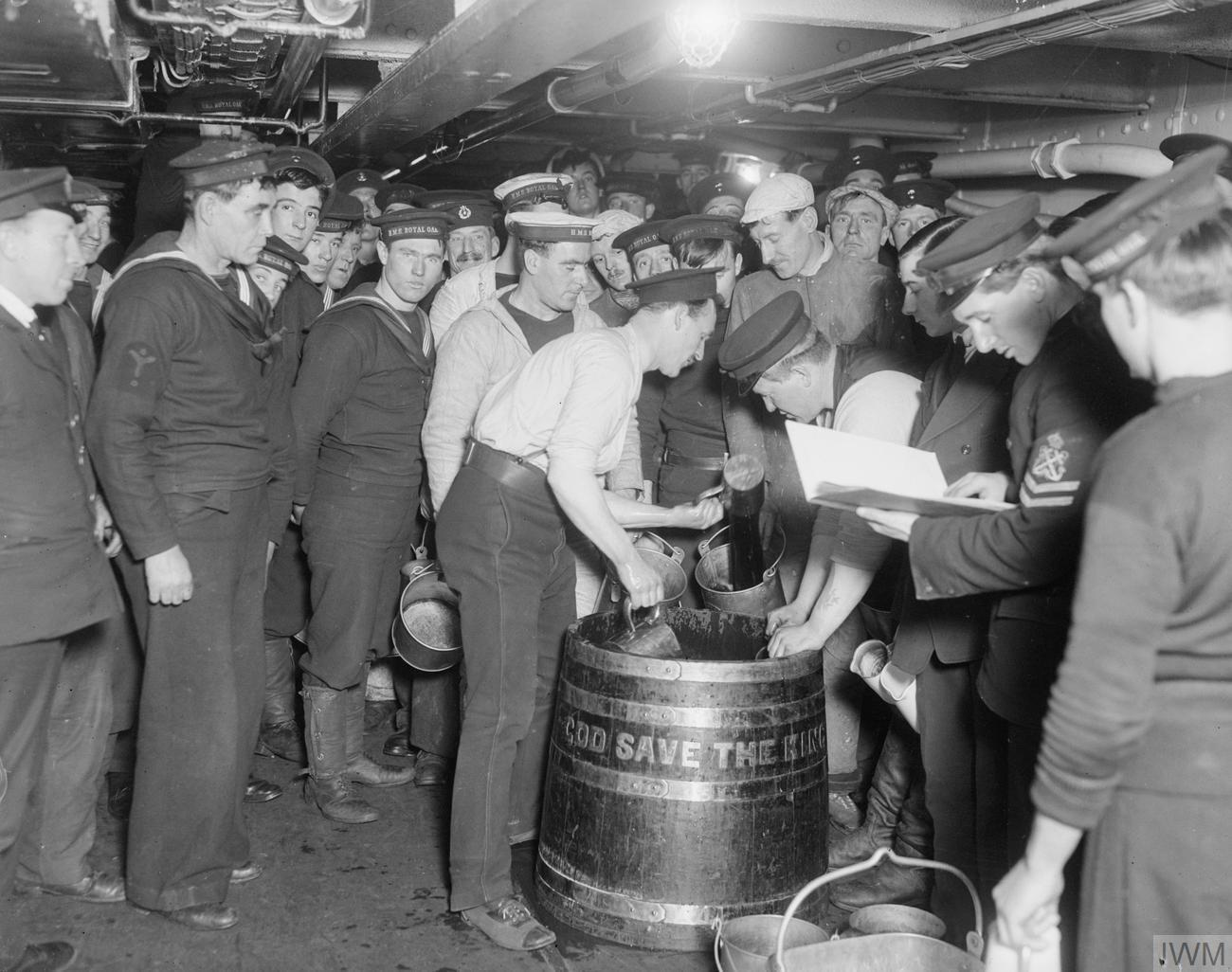
Royal Marines and bluejackets being served their rum rations on board HMS Royal Oak, 1916

A rum ration (also called the tot) was a daily amount of rum given to sailors aboard naval ships. The Royal Navy, alongside several Commonwealth navies, were best known for the practice. It was abolished in Britain on Black Tot Day in 1970 after concerns that the intake of strong alcohol would lead to unsteady hands when working machinery. The practice ended worldwide in 1990 when New Zealand was the last navy to abolish the practice.

== Tradition ==
In the Navy, the rum ration, or "tot", from 1866 to 1970 consisted of 1/8 pint (71.3 ml) of rum at 95.5 proof (54.6% ABV), given out at midday. Senior ratings (petty officers and above) received their rum neat, whilst for junior ratings it was diluted with two parts of water to make 3/8 pint of grog. Rum, due to its highly flammable nature, was stored in large barrels in a special rum store in the bowels of the ship. The rum ration was served from the "Rum Tub".

Not all sailors necessarily drew their rum: each had the option to be marked in the ship's books as "G" (for Grog) or "T" (for Temperance). Sailors who opted to be "T" were given threepence (3d) a day instead of the rum ration, although most preferred the rum. Sailors under 20 were not permitted a rum ration, and were marked on the ship's books as "UA" (Under Age).

The time when the rum ration was distributed was called "Up Spirits", which was between 11 am and 12 noon. A common cry from the sailors was "Stand fast the Holy Ghost". This was in response to the bosun's call "Up Spirits". Each mess had a "Rum Bosun" who would collect the rum in a metal container called a "fanny" from the Supply rating (Jack Dusty) responsible for measuring out the right number of tots for each mess.

Tot glasses were kept separate from any other glasses. They were washed on the outside, but never inside, in the belief that residue of past tots would stick to the side of the glass and make the tot even stronger.

== History ==
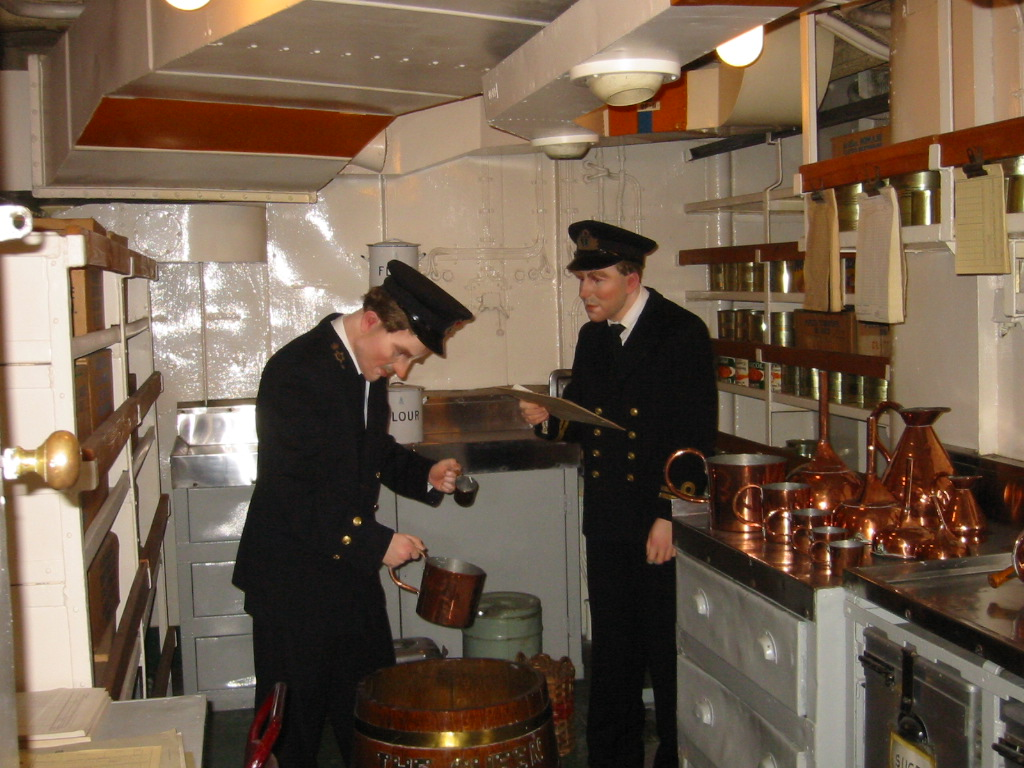
Measuring out the tot (diorama aboard HMS Belfast)

Prior to 1800, a British sailor's ration of alcoholic beverage was originally mild beer (2–3% ABV) with a daily ration of one wine gallon, approximately 128 ounces, although frequently small beer was used with an alcohol content below 1%. This official allowance continued until after the Napoleonic Wars. When beer was not available (such as when ships were sent into warmer climates), one pint of wine was usually issued, depending on what was locally available. However, most ships also carried supplies of spirits based on what was locally available: in the Mediterranean, brandy, in the East Indies, arrack, and in the West Indies, rum. In 1805 the Admiralty purchased more than twice as much brandy as rum, and the navy was brewing beer to provision ships as late as 1832. Around 1806, however, rum became the standard spirit, and was often procured from distillers in Barbados, Guyana, Trinidad and Tobago and, sometimes, Jamaica. There was no single "blend", rather the Navy bought and combined rums on an ad hoc basis.

The practice of compulsorily diluting rum in the proportion of half a pint to one quart of water (1:4) was first introduced in 1740 by Admiral Edward Vernon (known as Old Grog, because of his habitual grogram cloak). The ration was split into two servings, one between 10 am and noon and the other between 4 and 6 pm. Around 1795, it became practice for ships to carry lemon juice, to prevent scurvy. Rations were cut in half in 1824 and again in half, to the traditional amount, one-eighth of an imperial pint (71 ml), in 1850.

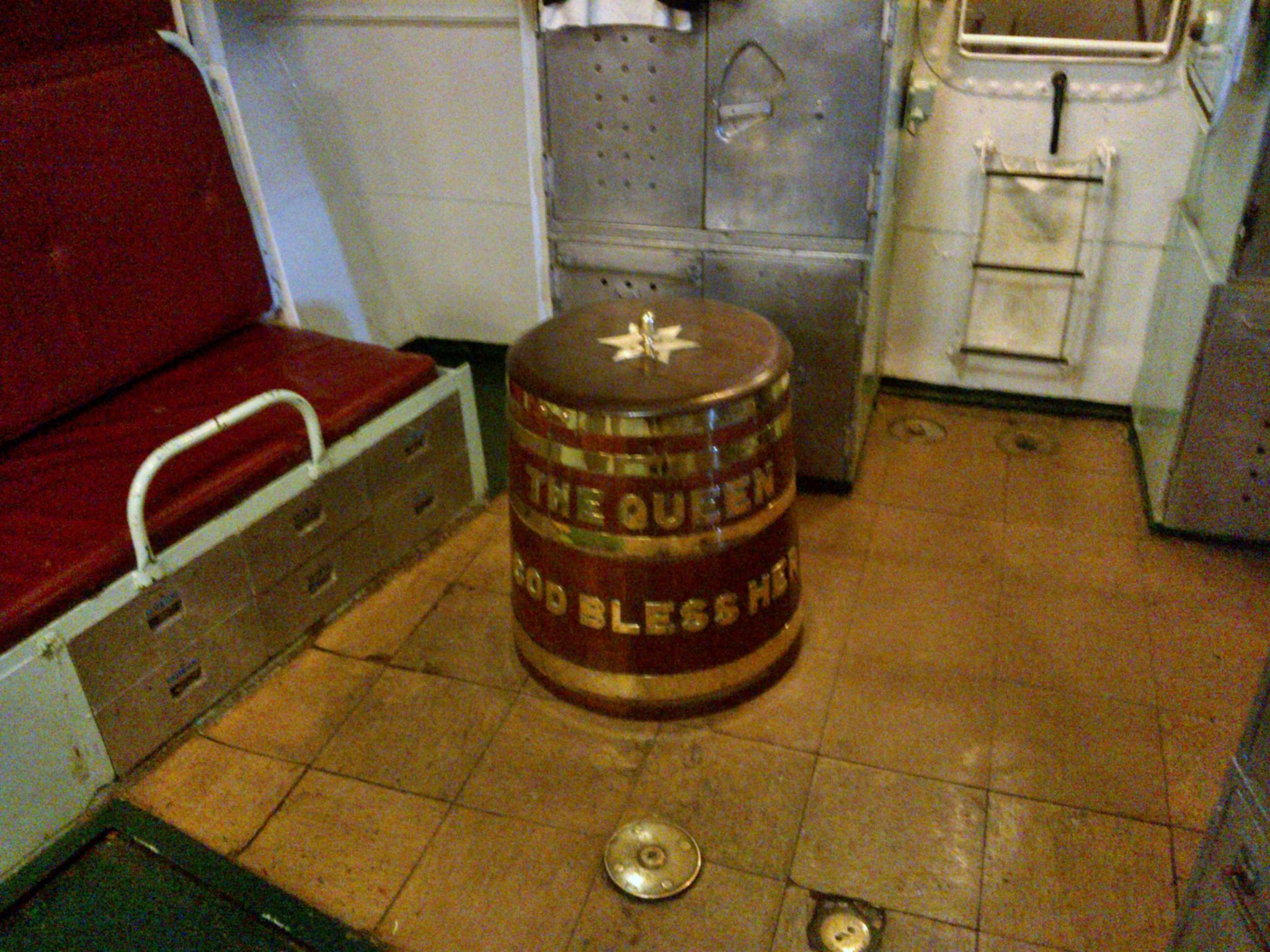
The rum tub of HMS Cavalier

The abolition of the rum ration had been discussed in Parliament in 1850 and again in 1881, but nothing came of it. On 17 December 1969 the Admiralty Board issued a written answer to a question from the MP for Woolwich East, Christopher Mayhew, saying "The Admiralty Board concludes that the rum issue is no longer compatible with the high standards of efficiency required now that the individual's tasks in ships are concerned with complex, and often delicate, machinery and systems on the correct functioning of which people's lives may depend". This led to a debate in the House of Commons on the evening of 28 January 1970, now referred to as the "Great Rum Debate", started by James Wellbeloved, MP for Erith and Crayford, who believed that the ration should not be removed. The debate lasted an hour and 15 minutes and closed at 10:29 p.m. with a decision that the rum ration was no longer appropriate.

=== Black Tot Day ===
In 1970, Admiral Peter Hill-Norton abolished the rum ration as he felt it could have led to sailors failing a breathalyser test and being less capable to manage complex machinery. This decision to end the rum ration was made after the Secretary of State for Defence had taken opinions from several ranks of the Navy. Ratings were instead allowed to purchase beer, and the amount allowed was determined, according to the MP David Owen, by the amount of space available for stowing the extra beer in ships. The last rum ration was on 31 July 1970 and became known as Black Tot Day as sailors were unhappy about the loss of the rum ration.

31 July 1970 was the final day of the rum ration and it was poured as usual at 6 bells in the forenoon watch (11am) after the pipe of "up spirits". Some sailors wore black armbands, tots and rum tubs were "buried at sea" and, in one navy training camp, HMS Collingwood, the Royal Naval Electrical College at Fareham in Hampshire, there was a mock funeral procession complete with black coffin and accompanying drummers and piper. The move was not popular with the ratings despite an extra can of beer being added to the daily rations in compensation. The Portsmouth General Post Office issued a special cancellation reading "Last Issue of Rum to the Royal Navy 31 July 1970".

Black Tot Day was subsequently followed in two other Commonwealth navies:

- 31 March 1972 was the final day of the rum ration in the Royal Canadian Navy.
- 28 February 1990 was the final day of the rum ration in the Royal New Zealand Navy. As the New Zealand Navy was the last to regularly issue a rum ration, this marked the global end of the rum ration.

In place of the rum ration, sailors were allowed to buy three one-half imperial pint (280 ml) cans of beer a day, and were provided improved recreational facilities to make up for the loss of rum. While the rum ration was abolished, the order to "splice the mainbrace", awarding sailors an extra tot of rum for good service, remained as a command which could only be given by the Monarch and is still used to recognise good service. Rum rations are also given on special occasions: in recent years, examples included the 100th anniversary of the Royal Canadian Navy in 2010 and after the Queen's Diamond Jubilee celebrations in 2012.

== In other navies ==
In the United States Navy, the ration was originally rum before being replaced with American whiskey. The daily ration was one-half US pint (240 ml) of distilled spirits until 1842, when it was reduced to one gill (120 ml). It was abolished in 1862.

While the Royal Australian Navy never issued the rum ration, their sailors were entitled to the rum ration when they were on Royal Navy ships until 1921.

== See also ==
- Beer day
