= Painkiller (cocktail) =

Rum cocktail

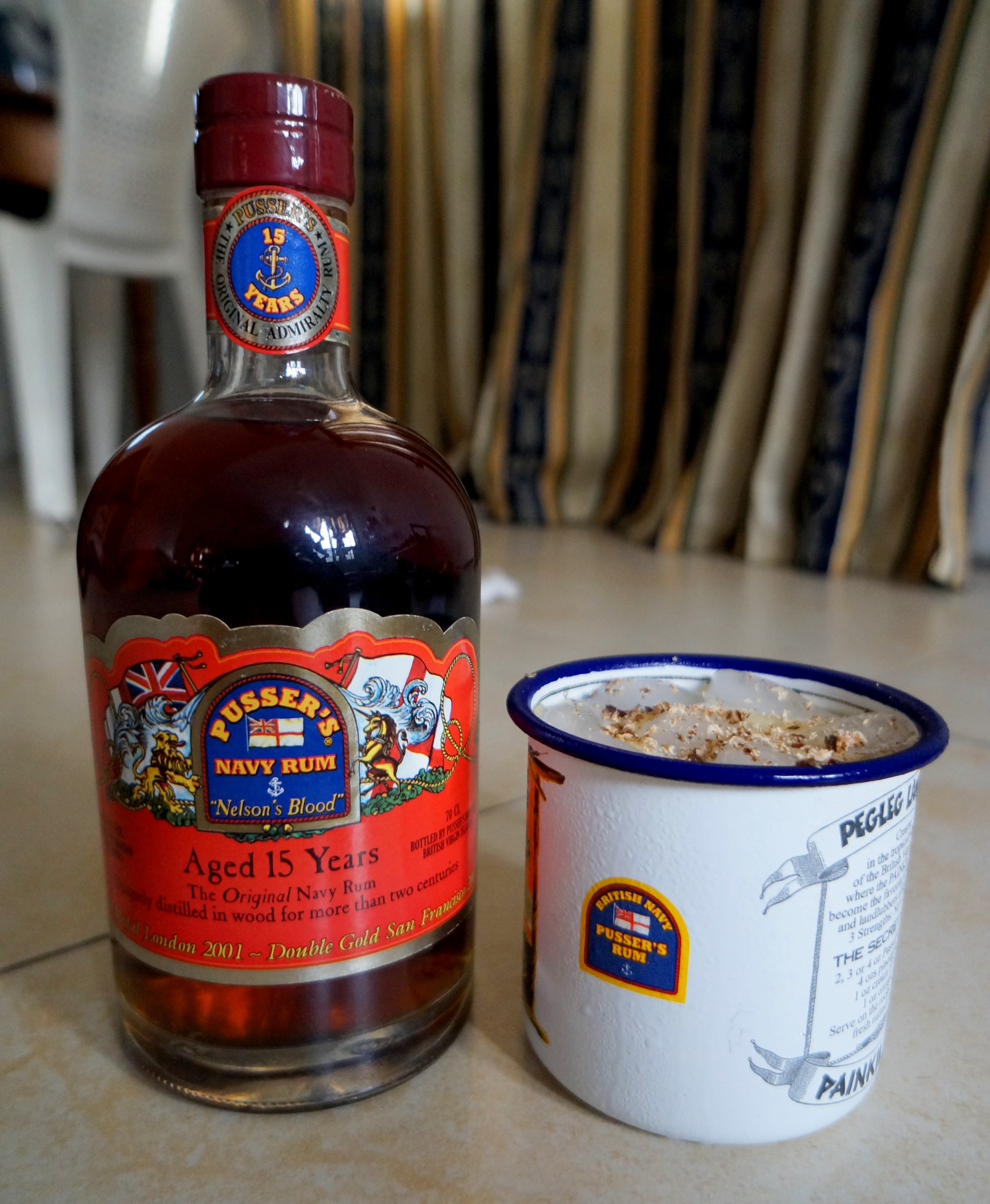
- A Painkiller and a bottle of Pussers
- Type: Cocktail
- Ingredients: 2–4 part(s) Rum; 4 parts pineapple juice; 1 part cream of coconut; 1 part orange juice; Sprinkle with nutmeg
- Base spirit: Rum
- Standard garnish: Nutmeg
- Served: On the rocks: poured over ice
- Preparation: Shake and garnish

A Painkiller is a rum cocktail often associated with the British Virgin Islands, its place of origin. The Painkiller is a blend of rum with four parts pineapple juice, one part cream of coconut and one part orange juice, well shaken and served on the rocks with a generous amount of fresh grated nutmeg on top. One serving may be made with two, three, or four ounces of rum.

== History ==
The original Painkiller was created in the 1970s at the Soggy Dollar Bar at White Bay on the island of Jost Van Dyke in the British Virgin Islands. The inventor may have been Daphne Henderson, or George and Marie Myrick, previous owners of the Soggy Dollar. It was originally made using Cruzan Rum.

In 1989, Pusser's Rum Ltd. filed a US trademark on the Painkiller's name and recipe. When a Tiki bar named Painkiller opened in New York City in 2011, Pusser's sent a cease and desist order to owners Giuseppe Gonzalez and Richard Boccato, both for the bar's name and for selling Painkiller cocktails made with rums other than Pusser's. Gonzalez and Boccato reached an out-of-court settlement with Pusser's, which included them renaming the bar to PKNY. In response to the news, numerous bartenders organized a boycott against Pusser's Rum.

== See also ==
- List of cocktails
- Dark 'N' Stormy
- Hand Grenade
- Piña colada
- Sazerac
