= Splice the mainbrace =

Order given aboard naval vessels

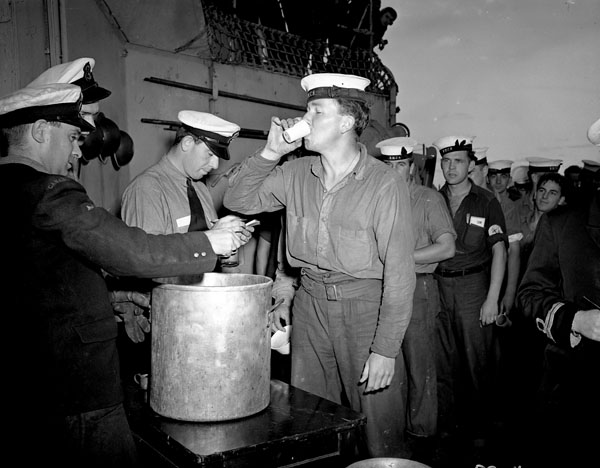
Canadian sailors aboard HMCS Prince Robert line up to splice the mainbrace in celebration of V-J Day.

"Splice the mainbrace" is an order given aboard naval vessels to issue the crew with an alcoholic drink. Originally an order for one of the most difficult emergency repair jobs aboard a sailing ship, it became a euphemism for authorized celebratory drinking afterward, and then the name of an order to grant the crew an extra ration of rum or grog.

== History ==
Braces are the lines that control the angle of the yards. On square-rigged ships, the mainbrace was the longest line in all of the running rigging. It was common to aim for the ship's rigging during naval battles. If the mainbrace was shot away, it was usually necessary to repair it during the engagement; the ship was unmanoeuvrable without it and would have to stay on the same tack. Even repairing it after the battle was a difficult job; the mainbrace ran through blocks, so it could not be repaired with a short splice or a knot. Splicing in a large run of hemp was strenuous work, and generally the ship's best able seamen were chosen to carry out the task under the supervision of the boatswain ("bosun"). On completion of the task, it was customary for the men to be rewarded with an extra ration of rum. The boatswain would take a sip from the ration of each of the men he had selected for the task. Eventually the order to "splice the mainbrace" came to mean that the crew would receive an extra ration of rum, and it was issued on special occasions: after victory in battle, the change of a monarch, a royal birth, a royal wedding or an inspection of the fleet. In cases where the whole fleet was to receive the signal, it would be run up with a lift of flags or signalled by semaphore.

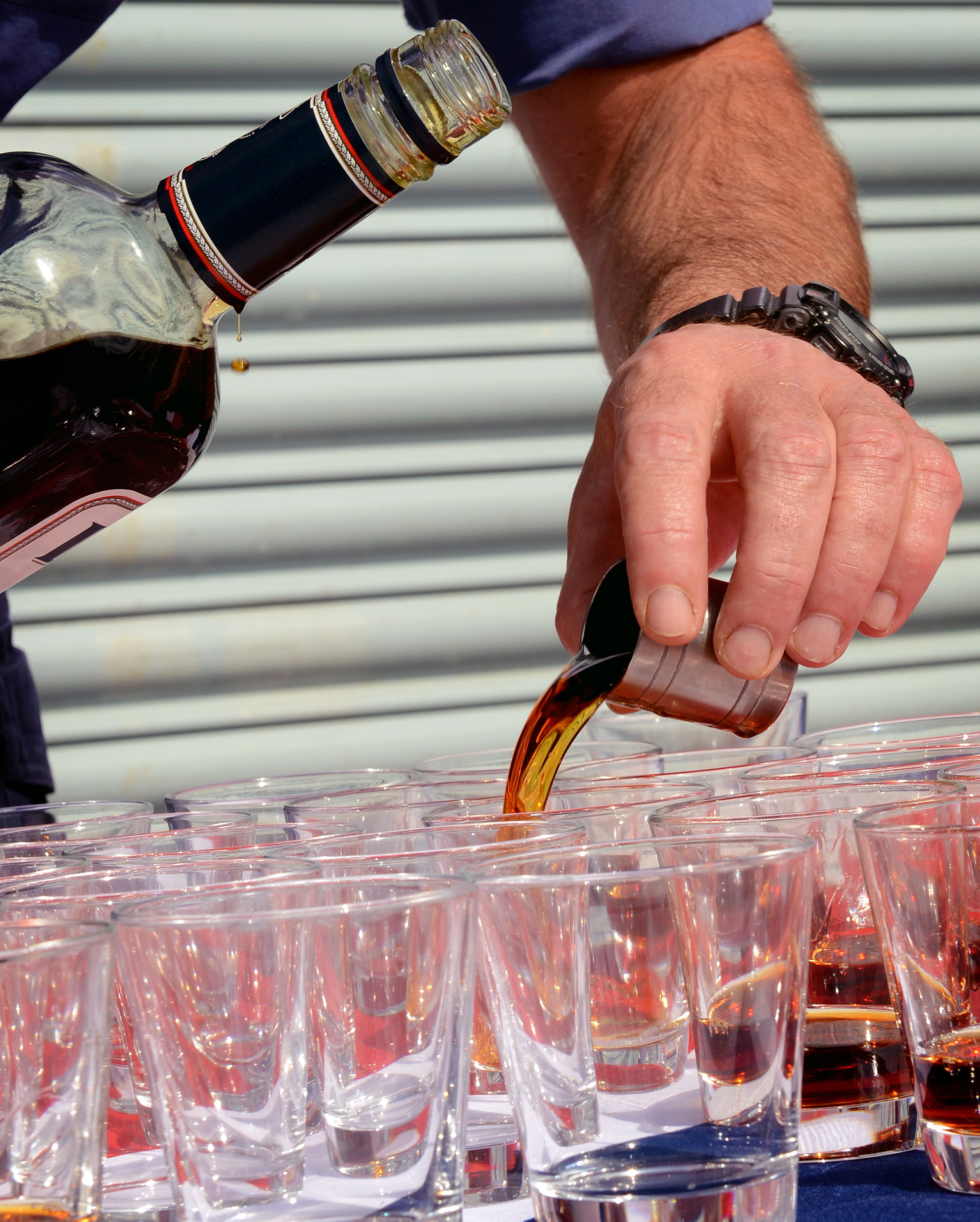
A sailor on board HMS York measures out tots of rum for the ship's company

A ration of rum a day was standard issue in the Royal Navy until 1970, when concerns over crew members operating machinery under the influence of alcohol led to the rum ration being abolished. However, in regard to those who could "splice the mainbrace", any man or officer over the age of 18 who desired to take it received an extra issue of one-eighth of a pint of rum. Lemonade was issued to those who did not wish for the rum. The rum was mixed with water to make grog for all ratings below Petty Officer. Only ratings marked "G" (for Grog) in the ship's books could draw rum, grog, or lemonade when the mainbrace was spliced and no payment in lieu was available. In the days when the daily ration was issued, those under 20 were marked "U.A." (for under age) in the ship's book; they were barred from drawing the daily rum ration. "T" stood for Temperance (for those of Temperance Movement); those choosing this option were compensated an extra threepence (3d) a day. The issue of rum to wardroom and gunroom officers was stopped in 1881 and ended for warrant officers in 1918; splicing the mainbrace was the only time that officers could be issued with rum.

Other navies abolished the grog allowance far earlier (the United States Navy after the American Civil War), but the order persisted, allowing the crew to take another drink in place of rum or grog; in 1845 it is recorded as being substituted for the more rowdy "Crossing the Line" ceremony. The Royal New Zealand Navy was the last navy to issue junior and senior ratings a daily tot of rum, issuing its last daily rum ration on 1 March 1990. Today the Royal Canadian Navy is more generous with the allowances, allowing crew members to take 87.5 millilitres (3.08 imp fl oz; 2.96 US fl oz) of spirits compared with the 62.5 millilitres (2.20 imp fl oz; 2.11 US fl oz) allowed by the Royal Navy, although the Royal Navy does make allowance for paucity of supplies, permitting two 350 millilitres (12 imp fl oz; 12 US fl oz) cans of beer to be issued if commercial spirits are not available.

The order "Splice the Mainbrace" was still popular with some of the U.S. Navy's submarine fleet during WWII. On USS Barb, a skipper on combat patrols in WWII, during the boat's 8th and 9th missions in 1944, did in fact announce on the 1MC, "Splice the mainbrace," after each successful attack and sinking of a Japanese ship. On Barb's 8th combat patrol, the skipper promised the sinking of 5 ships; Barb delivered. After each sinking the skipper had a special cake made and each sailor was granted a shot of rotgut whiskey. On the 9th patrol, the skipper was able to sneak 24 cases of beer aboard which were distributed after each of Barb's successful attacks.

Permission to issue the order to splice the mainbrace is heavily restricted; the Royal Navy allows only the King, a member of the Royal Family, or the Admiralty Board to do so; the Royal Canadian Navy permits the King, the Governor General of Canada, or the Chief of the Defence Staff to issue it. When the Mediterranean fleet received the order from the Prince of Wales (the future Edward VIII) in 1932 it was the first time it had happened since 1918; it was accompanied by the order to "Mend and make clothes", another archaic signal which grants the crew a half-day holiday. Ships in most of the victorious fleets received the order at the end of the Second World War; one ship received the order while still under attack. King George VI issued the order in 1949 to the crew of HMS Amethyst after the Yangtse Incident. It was ordered on the day of Queen Elizabeth's coronation in 1953, on 29 July 1981 for the wedding of Prince Charles and Lady Diana Spencer and of Prince William's birth on 21 June 1982, when "Splice the Mainbrace" was celebrated in the Fleet just one week after the end of the Falklands War. Nowadays, when rum is no longer issued daily, the order is somewhat more freely given: the Queen issued it after her Silver Jubilee celebrations in 1977 and Golden Jubilee in 2002, after the Trafalgar 200 Fleet Review in 2005, after her Diamond Jubilee celebrations in 2012 and to celebrate the birth of Prince Louis.

In Canada, the order was most recently given by Queen Elizabeth II on 29 June 2010 at the conclusion of the International Fleet Review for the occasion of the Royal Canadian Navy's 100th Anniversary. She signalled:

It has given me great pleasure to return with the Duke of Edinburgh to Halifax, Nova Scotia, to witness the International Fleet Review celebrating the Centennial of Canada's Navy. Maritime Command has confirmed through the smartness of its people and ships, and superb execution of the International Fleet Review, the best traditions of service on the sea. I offer to all the officers, men and women of the Canadian Atlantic Fleet my congratulations. It is particularly pleasing to see the strong bonds forged by Canada's Navy with the Allied Navies gathered here today. May all visiting sailors and delegations return safely to their home ports with fond memories of this historic celebration. I know how greatly the dockyard and other supporting services have contributed to making this International Fleet review an occasion which I shall long remember. The Royal Canadian Navy can take great pride in the accomplishments of the past, in its ongoing service to Canada, and the Significant contribution to Security on the world's oceans. Prince Philip and I send our warm good wishes to all of you and look forward to following your important endeavours as you sail to meet the challenges of another century of service. Splice the mainbrace.

— Elizabeth R

In 2023, on the morning of his coronation, King Charles III issued the command as a joking sign-off to his former subordinates on HMS Bronington, a wood-walled vessel decommissioned in 1988.

== In other cultures ==
German maritime tradition uses the term "Besanschot an!" (belay[ed] spanker sheet!)
